This is a list of MPs, Members of the Finnish Parliament. The list contains Parliamentary groups. An individual MP could be a member of more than one parliamentary group due to defection or break up of a political party.

Agrarian League / Centre Party

1900s and 1910s

 Santeri Alkio (1907–1908, 1909–1914, 1917–1922)  (defected from Young Finnish Party group)
 Kusti Arhama (1917–1930, 1933–1945)
 Ilmari Auer (1929–1930)
 Kustavi Elovaara (1919–1922)
 Jalmari Haapanen (1917)
 Santeri Haapanen  (1917–1919)
 Frans Hanhisalo (1919–1921)
 Eero Hatva (1910–1914, 1917–1929)
 John Hedberg (1908–1910, 1911–1917)
 Juho Heikkinen (1907–1911, 1917–1922)
 Pekka Heikkinen (1919–1922, 1924–1940)
 Juho Heimonen (1908–1909)
 Janne Ihamuotila (1924–1929)
 Pekka Toivo Ikonen (1933–1939, 1942–1951)
 Vilkku Joukahainen (1917–1924)
 Antti Junes (1910–1914, 1919–1933, 1936–1945)
 Antti Juutilainen (1917–1930)
 Kalle Jäykkä (1914–1917)
 Kustaa Adolf Kakriainen
 Kyösti Kallio (1907–1937)
 Otto Karhi (1907–1908, 1909–1914)
 Heikki Kiiskinen (1907–1908)
 Olli Kiiskinen
 Yrjö Kiuru (1911–1917)
 Väinö Kivilinna (1922–1924)
 Janne Koivuranta (1919–1945, 1948–1951)
 Juho Kokko (1914–1922)
 Antti Kukkonen (1919–1945, 1954–1962)
 Lauri Kuoppamäki (1917)
 Frans Kärki (1919–1927)
 Oskari Lahdensuo (1910–1919)
 Artturi Laitinen (1909–1910)
 Ivar Lantto (1908–1909, 1917–1919)
 Matti Latvala (1909–1917, 1919–1922)
 Antero Leinola (1909–1914)
 Mikko Leinonen 
 Bertta Leppälä (1917–1922)
 Juhani Leppälä (1907–1908, 1919–1922, 1927–1951)
 Niilo Liakka (1919–1922)
 Kalle Lohi (1909–1945)
 Jaakko Loppi (1919–1922)
 Jaakko Loukko (1918–1924) (defected from Finnish Party group)
 Mikko Luopajärvi (1914–1920)
 Tilda Löthman-Koponen 
 Albin Manner (1917–1927, 1929–1933)
 Henrik Niskanen (1919–1924)
 Juho Niukkanen (1917–1933, 1936–1954)
 Kalle Nurmela (1914–1919)
 Matti Oja (1919–1922)
 Esko Oranen (1910–1914)
 Oskari Partanen (1914–1917)
 Eero Pehkonen (1914–1918)
 Lauri Perälä (1919–1924)
 Aarno Pesonen (1919–1924)
 Yrjö Pesonen (1919–1922)
 Mikko Piitulainen (1919–1922, 1924–1927)
 Simson Pilkka (1919–1924, 1929–1930)
 Ari Pitkänen (1919–1922)
 Matti Poutiainen (1908–1917)
 Salomo Pulkkinen (1911–1917)
 Erkki Pullinen (1930–1933)
 Kalle Kustaa Pykälä (1907–1915)
 August Raatikainen
 Lauri Kristian Relander (1910–1914, 1917–1920)
 Antti Rentola (1917–1919)
 Juho Ryynänen (1919–1933)
 Hilma Räsänen (1907–1908)
 Filip Saalasti (1910–1917)
 Pekka Saarelainen (1914–1922, 1924–1930)
 Aleksis Salovaara (1917–1919)
 Wäinö Selander (1919–1922)
 Eetu Takkula (1917–1922)
 Pekka Tanskanen (1917–1919)
 Heikki Taskinen (1919–1922)
 Juho Torppa (1927–1929)
 Elias Tukia (1924–1948)
 Juho Tulikoura (1914–1917) (defected from Young Party group)
 Lauri Tuunanen (1907–1910)
 Karl Gustaf Veijola (1908–1909)
 Vihtori Vesterinen (1919–1951)
 Artur Wuorimaa (1917–1921)
 Otto Åkesson (1922–1924)
 Anna Ängeslevä (1908–1909)

1920s and 1930s

 Eemeli Aakula (1930–1936)
 Eino Aaltio (1929)
 Samppa Aittoniemi (1933–1936, 1948–1958)
 Anshelm Alestalo (1923–1939, 1945–1948)
 Jussi Annala (1930–1939, 1945–1951)
 Albin Asikainen (1929–1948)
 Akseli Brander (1933–1951)
 Kaarle Ellilä (1929–1930, 1932–1936)
 Hannes Eskola
 Aleksi Hakala
 Antti Halonen
 Matti Hannula (1929–1930)
 Uuno Hannula
 Yrjö Hautala (1945–1958, 1962–1966)
 Kustaa Hautamäki (1922–1924)
 Eino Heikura (1924–1927, 1951–1958)
 Veikko Heiskanen
 Lennart Heljas
 Olli Hirvensalo (1922–1924, 1930–1951)
 Salomon Hongisto
 Ville Honkavaara (1922–1924)
 Kaapro Huittinen
 Kaarlo Hurme (1924–1929)
 Väinö Huuhtanen
 Juho Hyvönen (1922–1924)
 Kaarlo Hänninen (1924–1939)
 Aapo Inkinen
 Toivo Janhonen (1924–1939)
 Kalle Joukanen (1930–1932, 1936–1945, 1948–1954)
 Eetu Jussila (1929–1930, 1931–1933)
 Emil Jutila
 Juho Kaakinen (1937–1938)
 Väinö Kaasalainen (1933–1936, 1951–1954)
 Lauri Kaijalainen
 Jukka Kailio (1938–1939)
 Viljami Kalliokoski (1922–1945, 1948–1962)
 Juho Kankkunen (1922–1924)
 Pekka Kankkunen
 Juho Kanniainen (1922–1924)
 Sanfrid Kariniva (1927–1930)
 Einari Karvetti
 Antti Kaura
 Jooseppi Kauranen (1922–1935)
 Urho Kekkonen (1936–1956)
 Antti Kemppi
 Pentti Kiiskinen (1938–1939)
 Kalle Kirra (1922–1930, 1936–1948)
 Vilho Kirveskoski
 Vilho Kivioja
 Kauno Kleemola (1939–1945, 1948–1965)
 Juho Koivisto (1927–1951)
 Oskari Kontio (1924–1933)
 Pekka Kopsa (1922–1929)
 Johannes Korhonen (1930–1933)
 Antti Kuisma (1922–1929, 1930–1933, 1935–1936)
 Kalle Kämäräinen (1930–1945, 1954–1962)
 Jalo Lahdensuo (1921–1938)
 Matti Lahtela
 Emil Lampinen (1930–1936, 1939–1954)
 Emil Lautala (1924–1933)
 Artturi Leinonen (1936–1939, 1944–1945)
 Matti Luoma-aho
 Aino Luostarinen (1927–1930, 1936–1953)
 Alpo Luostarinen (1930–1936)
 Eemil Luukka (1936–1966)
 Matti Makkonen (1922–1927)
 Jalmari Malmi (1921–1922)
 Aleksanteri Mero (1920–1922)
 Matti Miikki 
 Kaarlo Mikkola
 Valtteri Mikonmäki (1927–1933)
 Lauri Murtomaa (1939–1955)
 Lauri Mustakallio (1922–1924, 1927–1930)
 Wäinö Mäkinen (1922–1924)
 Kalle Määttä
 Matti Niilekselä
 Heikki Niskanen (1941–1945) (defected from Small Farmers' Party / Party of the Small Farmers' and the Rural People)
 Eero Nurmesniemi (1927–1933, 1936–1945)
 Matts Paavilainen (1927–1929)
 Juho Paksujalka (1933–1936, 1939–1948)
 Eino Palovesi (1939–1960)
 Niilo Pelttari (1924–1927)
 Heikki Peura (1920–1922)
 Juho Pilppula (1927–1948)
 Matti Pitkänen (1922–1936, 1939–1945)
 Juho Pyörälä (1939–1948)
 Matti Pärssinen (1939–1948)
 Antti Rantamaa (1939–1962)
 Tyko Reinikka (1922–1930)
 Olli Pekka Rissanen (1930–1933)
 Paavo Ruotsalainen (1929–1933)
 Eino Rytinki (1941–1945, 1949–1958)  (defected from Small Farmers' Party / Party of the Small Farmers' and the Rural People)
 Paavo Saarinen (1924–1933)
 Antti Sallinen (1922–1924, 1930–1933)
 Sulo Salo (1922–1929, 1930–1950)
 Lauri Sariola (1929–1930, 1933–1939)
 Tauno Saukkonen (1939–1948)
 Yrjö Schildt (1939–1945)
 Jaakko Seppänen (1922–1927)
 Heikki Soininen (1933–1957)
 Juho Sunila (1922–1927, 1929–1933)
 Anton Suurkonka (1930–1936, 1939–1945, 1948–1951)
 Juho Takala (1933–1939, 1940–1945)
 Mikko Tarkkanen (1922–1945, 1951–1954)
 Matti Tolppanen (1936–1945)
 Eino Tuomivaara (1924–1930)
 Jaakko Vainio (1922–1924)
 Vilho Vallas (1929–1930, 1933–1939)
 Heikki Vehkaoja (1924–1939, 1945–1948)
 Viljo Venho (1933–1939)
 Anttoni Vertanen (1924–1930)
 Taavi Vilhula (1929–1930, 1933–1954)
 Uuno Virranniemi (1939–1945)
 Bjarne Westermarck (1922–1923)

1940s and 1950s

 Toivo Antila (1951–1970)
 Eeli Erkkilä (1951–1973)
 Kusti Eskola (1945–1962)
 Erland Haapaniemi (1948–1954)
 Sylvi Halinen (1954–1970)
 Ale Holopainen (1957–1970)
 Martti Honkavaara (1957–1958)
 Leo Häppölä (1951–1970)
 Arvi Ikonen (1950–1957)
 Einari Jaakkola (1954–1966)
 Mauno Jussila (1951–1970)
 Kalle Jutila (1945)
 Artturi Jämsén (1954–1971)
 Lauri Kaarna (1951–1954)
 Nestori Kaasalainen (1951–1972)
 Aaro Kauppi (1951–1954, 1956–1958, 1963–1966)
 Matti Kekkonen (1958–1970)
 Pekka Kiiski
 Toivo Kinnunen
 Esa Koivusilta (1954–1958)
 Antti Koukkari (1945–1949)
 Urho Kähönen
 Olavi Lahtela (1958–1968)
 Marja Lahti (1954–1967)
 Lauri Laine
 Eino Laitinen
 Vilho Leivonen (1951–1954, 1962–1966)
 Lauri Leppihalme
 Matti Liinamaa (1958–1966)
 Onni Mannila (1948–1951, 1953–1954, 1955–1962)
 Aarre Marttila (1958–1961)
 Matti Mattila (1954–1975)
 Martti Miettunen (1945–1958)
 Esu Niemelä (1958–1972)
 Markus Niskala (1945–1963)
 Väinö Okko
 Akseli Paarman (1958–1966, 1969–1970)
 Hannes Paaso
 Atte Pakkanen (1948–1970)
 Eemil Partanen (1954–1972)
 Pentti Pekkarinen (1958–1975)
 Arvo Pentti (1958–1970)
 Eemil Pääkkönen (1945–1948, 1951–1954)
 Jussi Pöykkö
 Väinö Rankila (1948–1958)
 Lauri Riikonen
 Niilo Ryhtä (1948–1967)
 Erkki Ryömä (1955–1958, 1962–1966)
 Tahvo Rönkkö (1948–1972)
 Kerttu Saalasti (1948–1962, 1966–1970)
 Eero Saari (1951–1955)
 Yrjö Saari
 Toivo Salakivi (1945)
 Toivo Saloranta (1954–1958, 1960–1970, 1972–1975)
 Wiljam Sarjala (1948–1970)
 Veikko Savela (1958–1970)
 Vieno Simonen (1948–1962)
 Samuli Simula (1945–1951)
 Yrjö Sinkkonen (1954–1962, 1966–1972)
 Lauri Solla (1951–1954)
 V. J. Sukselainen (1948–1970, 1972–1979)
 Martti Suntela (1948–1951)
 Veikko Svinhufvud (1958–1966)
 Juho Tenhiälä (1966–1970)
 Ilmari Tiainen 
 Kustaa Tiitu (1945–1958, 1965–1970)
 Esa Timonen (1958–1966)
 Eino Uusitalo (1955–1983)
 Veikko Vennamo (1945–1959)
 Johannes Virolainen (1945–1983, 1987–1991)
 Hilja Väänänen (1951–1966)

1960s and 1970s

 Matti Asunmaa (1970–1979)
 Katri-Helena Eskelinen (1966–1987)
 Veikko Hanhirova (1966–1972, 1975–1979)
 Heikki Hasu (1962–1966, 1967–1970)
 Erkki Haukipuro (1966–1973)
 Veikko Honkanen (1962–1966, 1967–1970)
 Esko Härkönen (1970–1979)
 Mikko Jokela (1972–1987)
 Kauko Juhantalo (1979–1993, 1995–1999, 2003–2007, 2015–2019)
 Eero Juntunen (1962–1966)
 Katri Kaarlonen (1966–1972)
 Mikko Kaarna (1960–1962, 1966–1987)
 Orvokki Kangas (1970–1983)
 Reino Kangas (1962–1975)
 Eino Kankaanpää (1970)
 Ahti Karjalainen (1966–1979)
 Aino Karjalainen (1972–1979)
 Reino Karpola (1962–1979, 1983–1987)
 Markku Kauppinen (1979–1983)
 Olli Kervinen (1962–1966)
 Eeva Kuuskoski (1980–1995)  (defected from National Coalition Party group)
 Heimo Linna (1966–1987)
 Aaro Lintilä (1962–1972)
 Eino Lottanen (1966–1975)
 Matti Maijala (1970–1972, 1975–1991)
 Mauno Manninen (1973–1983, 1983–1987)
 Olavi Martikainen (1972–1987)
 Kalevi Mattila (1975–1995)
 Einari Nieminen (1972–1991)
 Paavo Niinikoski (1966–1975)
 Lauri Palmunen (1979–1983)
 Ahti Pekkala (1970–1985)
 Mauri Pekkarinen (1979–2019)
 Esko Pekonen (1970–1972, 1975–1983)
 Mikko Pesälä (1975–1999)
 Veikko Pihlajamäki (1972–1987)
 Mauno Pohjonen (1960–1970, 1971–1972)
 Hannele Pokka (1979–1994)
 Pentti Poutanen (1970–1987)
 Väinö Raudaskoski (1975–1987)
 Matti Ruokola (1970–1975, 1979–1983)
 Paula Ruutu (1962–1966, 1967–1970)
 Eino Räsänen (1962–1970)
 Sylvi Saimo (1966–1979)
 Alvar Saukko (1975–1983)
 Juhani Saukkonen (1972–1983)
 Petter Savola (1975–1983)
 Jouko Siikaniemi (1970–1975)
 Aulis Sileäkangas (1966–1970, 1972–1975)
 Sulo Suorttanen (1962–1970, 1972–1975)
 Lea Sutinen (1970–1987)
 Eino Sääskilahti (1962–1970)
 Hannu Tenhiälä (1975–1992)
 Juhani Tuomaala (1975–1987)
 Taisto Tähkämaa (1970–1991)
 Paavo Vesterinen (1975–1987)
 Pekka Vilmi (1963–1979)
 Kyllikki Virolainen (1977–1979)
 Mikko Volotinen (1966–1970)
 Paavo Väyrynen (1970–1995, 1999, 2007–2011, 2015)
 Marjatta Väänänen (1975–1991)
 Toivo Yläjärvi (1975–1987)
 Lasse Äikäs (1975–1983)
 Saimi Ääri (1970–1979, 1993–1995)

1980s and 1990s 

 Esko Aho (1983–2003)
 Hannu Aho (1999–2003)
 Sulo Aittoniemi (1994–1999)  (defected from Alkioist Centrist group and later to Centre Party group)
 Olavi Ala-Nissilä (1991–2006, 2015–2019)
 Juhani Alaranta (1983–1999)
 Sirkka-Liisa Anttila (1983–1996, 1999–2019)
 Maria Kaisa Aula (1991–2003)
 Rose-Marie Björkenheim (1991–1999)
 Kauko Heikkinen (1987–1995)
 Jorma Huuhtanen (1987–2000)
 Liisa Hyssälä (1995–2010)
 Pirkko Ikonen (1983–1991)
 Tuula Ikonen, myöhemmin Tuula Ikonen-Graafmans (1991–1995)
 Tytti Isohookana-Asunmaa (1983–2003)
 Esko Jokiniemi (1987–1995)
 Timo Järvilahti (1991–1995, 1996–1999)
 Anneli Jäätteenmäki (1987–2004)
 Timo Kalli (1991–)
 Kyösti Karjula (1995–2011)
 Riitta Kauppinen (1987–1994) (defected to National Coalition Party group)
 Hannu Kemppainen (1983–1987, 1991–1999)
 Inkeri Kerola (1999–2015)
 Niilo Keränen (1999–2003, 2015–)
 Timo Kietäväinen (1983–1991)
 Mari Kiviniemi (1995–2014)
 Annikki Koistinen (1987–1999)
 Heikki Kokko (1983–1991)
 Armas Komi (1991–1999)
 Katri Komi (1999–2015)
 Juha Korkeaoja (1991–2011)
 Ossi Korteniemi (1994–2001)
 Timo E. Korva (1991–1995, 2001–2003)
 Markku Koski (1991–1999, 2003–2007)
 Liisa Kulhia 
 Seppo Kääriäinen (1987–2019)
 Seppo Lahtela (1999–2006) (defected from National Coalition Party group)
 Jarmo Laivoranta (1991–1995)
 Markku Laukkanen (1991–1995, 1999–2011)
 Eero Lämsä (1995–2007)
 Paula Lehtomäki (1999–2015, 2017)
 Markku Lehtosaari (1987–1999)
 Jari Leppä (1999–)
 Johannes Leppänen (1991–2003)
 Raimo Liikkanen (1991–1999)
 Maija-Liisa Lindqvist (1991–1999, 2003–2007)
 Mika Lintilä (1999–)
 Hannes Manninen (1995–2011)
 Helmi Morri (1991–1995)
 Kari Myllyniemi (1995–2003)
 Tero Mölsä (1991–1995, 1995–1999, 1999–2003)
 Petri Neittaanmäki (1999–2007)
 Pekka Nousiainen (1999–2007)
 Lasse Näsi (1991–1995)
 Lauri Oinonen (1999–2011)
 Seppo Pelttari (1983–1995)
 Osmo Puhakka (1999–2003)
 Raili Puhakka (1991–1995)
 Martti Pura (1992–1995)
 Pekka Puska (1987–1991, 2017–)
 Antti Rantakangas (1999–2019)
 Aulis Ranta-Muotio (1995–2007)
 Olli Rehn (1991–1995, 2015–2017)
 Vuokko Rehn (1995–1999)
 Juha Rehula (1996–2019)
 Tellervo Renko (1986–1991, 1991–1995)
 Markku Rossi (1991–1995, 1999, 2000–)
 Matti Ryhänen (1996–1999)
 Mirja Ryynänen (1987–1995, 1999–2003)
 Kalle Röntynen (1987–1995)
 Pauli Saapunki (1987–2003)
 Tanja Karpela (1999–2011)
 Aapo Saari (1983–1999)
 Mauri Salo (1995–1996, 1999–2003, 2006–2007, 2010–2011)
 Kimmo Sarapää (1987–1991)
 Juho Sillanpää (1987–1991) 
 Eino Siuruainen (1987–1991)
 Aino Suhola (1991–1999)
 Hannu Takkula (1995–2004)
 Matti Vanhanen (1991–2010, 2015–)
 Anu Vehviläinen (1995–2003, 2007–)
 Maija-Liisa Veteläinen (1995–1999)
 Jukka Vihriälä (1983–2007)
 Pekka Viljanen (1991–1995)
 Pekka Vilkuna (1999–2011)
 Kyösti Virrankoski (1991–1995)
 Markku Vuorensola (1991–1999)
 Matti Väistö (1987–2007)
 Jaana Ylä-Mononen (1999–2007)

2000s and 2010s 

 Esko Ahonen (2003–2011)
 Pekka Aittakumpu (2019–)
 Mikko Alatalo (2003–2019)
 Risto Autio (2007–2011)
 Anne Berner (2015–2019)
 Susanna Haapoja (2003–2009)
 Pertti Hakanen (2015–2019)
 Lasse Hautala (2003–2007, 2009–2019)
 Hannakaisa Heikkinen (2007–2011, 2015–)
 Petri Honkonen (2015–)
 Hannu Hoskonen (2003–2011, 2015–)
 Hanna Huttunen (2019–)
 Tuomo Hänninen (2003–2011)
 Marisanna Jarva (2015–2019)
 Antti Kaikkonen (2003–)
 Eeva Kalli (2019–)
 Anne Kalmari (2007–)
 Oiva Kaltiokumpu (2007–2011)
 Tatja Karvonen (2004–2007)
 Elsi Katainen (2007–2018)
 Timo Kaunisto (2007–2011)
 Hilkka Kemppi (2019–)
 Rauno Kettunen (2003–2007)
 Tuomas Kettunen (2019–)
 Mikko Kinnunen (2019–)
 Esko Kiviranta (2003–)
 Pasi Kivisaari (2019–)
 Timo Korhonen (2007–2019)
 Laila Koskela (2014–2015) (defected from the Finns Party's group)
 Hanna Kosonen (2015–)
 Katri Kulmuni (2015–)
 Antti Kurvinen (2015–)
 Mikko Kärnä (2015–2018, 2019–)
 Joonas Könttä (2019–)
 Eero Lankia (2003–2007)
 Markus Lohi (2011–)
 Eeva-Maria Maijala (2011–2019)
 Hanna-Leena Mattila (2018–)
 Juha Mieto (2007–2011)
 Eija Nivala (2018)
 Jouni Ovaska (2019–)
 Markku Pakkanen (2007–2011, 2015–2019)
 Aila Paloniemi (2003–2019)
 Ulla Parviainen (2015–2019)
 Terhi Peltokorpi (2004–2007, 2014–2015)
 Klaus Pentti (2003–2011)
 Arto Pirttilahti (2011–)
 Tuomo Puumala (2007–2019)
 Juha Pylväs (2015–)
 Eero Reijonen (2003–2015, 2018–2019)
 Simo Rundgren (2003–2007, 2011–2015)
 Annika Saarikko (2011–)
 Pertti Salovaara (2003–2011)
 Mikko Savola (2011–)
 Janne Seurujärvi (2007–2011)
 Paula Sihto (2007–2011)
 Juha Sipilä (2011–)
 Seppo Särkiniemi (2003–2007, 2010–2011)
 Martti Talja (2015–2019)
 Kimmo Tiilikainen (2003–2019)
 Ari Torniainen (2011–)
 Tapani Tölli (2003–2019)
 Markku Uusipaavalniemi (2007–2010) (defected from the Finns Party's group)
 Mirja Vehkaperä (2007–2018)
 Eerikki Viljanen (2015–2019)

Alkioist Centrist Group
 Sulo Aittoniemi (1999–2003) (defected from Centre Party group)

Alternative for Finland 
 Vesa Laukkanen (1993–1995) (defected from Christian League group)

Change 2011
 James Hirvisaari (2013–2015) (formed new group; left the Finns Party's group)

Christian Democrats / Christian League 

 Sauli Ahvenjärvi (2011–2015)
 Esko Almgren (1979–1991)
 Sari Essayah (2003–2007, 2015–)
 Jorma Fred (1975–1983, 1987–1991)
 Sauli Hautala (1975–1983, 1987–1991)
 Leea Hiltunen (1991–1995, 1999–2003)
 Antero Juntumaa (1972–1983)
 Ulla Järvilehto (1975–1983)
 Jouko Jääskeläinen (1991–2003, 2011–2015)
 Bjarne Kallis (1991–2011)
 Toimi Kankaanniemi (1987–2011)
 Marja-Leena Kemppainen (1999–2003)
 Erkki Korhonen (1975–1979, 1979–1983)
 Kari Kärkkäinen (1999–2011)
 Pirkko Laakkonen (1991–1995)
 Antero Laukkanen (2015–)
 Vesa Laukkanen (1991–1993) (defected to Alternative for Finland group)
 Olavi Majlander (1975–1978)
 Veikko Matikkala (1975–1979)
 Eeva-Liisa Moilanen (1987–1995)
 Impi Muroma (1975–1987)
 Sari Palm (2007–2015)
 Tauno Pehkonen (1995–1999)
 Lyly Rajala (2003) (defected to National Coalition Party group)
 Leena Rauhala (1999–2015)
 Väinö Rautiainen (1979–1983)
 Olavi Ronkainen (1972–1975, 1979–1987) 
 Matti Ryhänen (1995–1996) (defected to Centre Party group)
 Päivi Räsänen (1995–)
 Ismo Seivästö (1991–1995, 1999–2003)
 Sakari Smeds (1995–2003)
 Asser Stenbäck (1979–1983)
 Tarja Tallqvist (2007–2011)
 Sari Tanus (2015–)
 Veikko Turunen (1972–1975)
 Raino Westerholm (1970–1979)
 Peter Östman (2011–)

Christian Workers' Union 
 Kaarlo Heininen (1907–1908)
 Matti Helenius-Seppälä (1908–1909, 1911–1914, 1917, 1919–1920)
 Antti Kaarne (1908–1911) 
 Juho Kekkonen (1919–1922)
 Matti Merivirta (1907–1908)
 Eelis Rantanen (1921–1922)
 Oskari Vihantola (1919)

Citizens' Party
 Paavo Väyrynen (2018) (formed new group; later formed the Seven Star Movement's parliamentary group)

Constitutional Right Party  / Constitutional People's Party 
 Ulla Bogdanoff (1986–1987) (defected from Rural Party group) 
 Georg C. Ehrnrooth (1973–1979, 1983–1987) (defected from Swedish People's Party group) 
 Salme Katajavuori (1973–1975) (defected from National Coalition Party group) 
 Kullervo Rainio (1978–1979) (defected from National Coalition Party group)

Democratic Alternative 
 Matti Kautto (1986–1987) (defected from People's Democratic League group)
 Mikko Kuoppa (1986–1987) (defected from People's Democratic League group  and later to Left Alliance)
 Ensio Laine (1986–1990) (defected from People's Democratic League group  and later to Left Alliance)
 Marja-Liisa Löyttyjärvi (1986–1990) (defected from People's Democratic League group  and later to Left Alliance)
 Irma Rosnell (1986–1987) (defected from People's Democratic League group)
 Marjatta Stenius-Kaukonen (1986–1990) (defected from People's Democratic League group  and later to Left Alliance)
 Sten Söderström (1986–1987) (defected from People's Democratic League group)
 Esko-Juhani Tennilä (1986–1990) (defected from People's Democratic League group  and later to Left Alliance)
 Seppo Toiviainen (1986–1987) (defected from People's Democratic League group)
 Pirkko Turpeinen (1986–1987) (defected from People's Democratic League group)

Finnish Front 
 Heikki Riihijärvi (1993–1995) (defected from Rural Party)

Finnish Party 

 Juho Aitamurto 
 Eveliina Ala-Kulju (1907–1910, 1917–1918)
 Ivar Alanen (1917–1918)
 Walfrid Alhainen
 Walter Andersin (1909)
 Benjamin Anneberg
 Juho Erkki Antila 
 Juhani Arajärvi (1907–1914, 1917–1918)
 Waldemar Bergroth (1917–1918)
 Vilho Cornér (1914–1917)
 Richard Danielson-Kalmari (1907–1917)
 Aukusti Eronen
 Hannes Gebhard (1907–1909)
 Hedvig Gebhard (1907–1909)
 Aleksandra Gripenberg (1907–1909)
 Reinhold Grönvall (1910–1917)
 Santeri Haapanen (1909–1911)
 Kyösti Haataja
 Oskar Hainari
 Herman Hakulinen
 Onni Hallsten 
 Yrjö Halonen (1908–1909, 1914–1917)
 Antti Hanninen (1911–1914)
 Emil Helkiö
 Oskari Herttua (1911–1914)
 Elli Hiidenheimo (1917–1918)
 Pentti Hiidenheimo (1914–1917)
 Aukusti Hiltula
 Valde Hirvikanta (1909–1910)
 August Hjelt
 Iisakki Hoikka (1907–1908, 1909–1910)
 Mauri Honkajuuri (1909–1914)
 August Hyöki (1917, 1918)
 Kalle Häkkinen
 Mikko Iipponen (1911–1917)
 Leander Ikonen
 Pekka Ikonen (1914–1917)
 Pekka Toivo Ikonen (1917)
 Lauri Ingman (1907–1918)
 Mikko Jaskari (1914–1917)
 Taave Junnila (1908–1914)
 Kalle Kaakko-oja (1910–1914)
 Erkki Kaila (1917–1918)
 Oswald Kairamo (1907–1914, 1917–1918)
 Kaarlo Kares (1907–1910)
 Edvard Kilpeläinen (1914–1917)
 Väinö Kivilinna (1907–1909)
 Liisi Kivioja
 Kaarle Knuutila (1907–1908, 1910–1914)
 Aleksanteri Koivisto (1907–1918)
 Emanuel Kolkki (1907–1909)
 Matti Kotila
 Tahvo Kruus
 Hilda Käkikoski
 Aleksi Käpy (1907–1909)
 Pietari Kärnä (1911–1914)
 Arthur Lagerlöf
 Oskari Laine
 Juho Lallukka
 Kaarlo Lanne (1910–1914, 1917–1918)
 Juho Lepistö
 Akseli Listo (1907–1917)
 Wilho Louhivuori
 Jaakko Loukko (1918) (defected to Agrarian League group)
 Juho Malkamäki (1909–1911)
 Wilhelmi Malmivaara (1907–1918)
 Juho Mannermaa (1911–1917)
 Kalle Myllylä
 Juho Mynttinen
 Ernst Nevanlinna (1907–1914, 1917–1918)
 Hjalmar Nordling (1910)
 Taneli Nykänen
 Väinö Nyström
 Kaarle Kustaa Ojanen
 Aate Olkkonen
 Juho Kusti Paasikivi (1907–1909, 1910–1914)
 Olli Pajari
 Heikki Pakkala
 Ernst Palmén (1907–1909)
 Hjalmar Paloheimo
 Oskari Peurakoski (1909–1918)
 Tuomas Pohjanpalo (1907–1909)
 Erkki Pullinen (1907–1917) (defected to People's Party group)
 Bror Hannes Päivänsalo (1977–1918)
 Erik Pöysti
 Kaarle Raade (1917)
 Sameli Rajala (1907–1910)
 Juho Rannikko (1907–1917)
 Kaarle Rantakari (1917)
 Onni Rantasalo (1917–1918)
 Frans Rapola (1970–1910)
 Akseli Rauanheimo
 Hugo Rautapää (1910–1914)
 Vilho Reima
 Heikki Repo (1907–1908, 1909–1911, 1917)
 Alfred Retulainen (1914–1918)
 Justus Ripatti (1907–1908, 1910–1912)
 Juuso Runtti (1907–1908, 1917–1918)
 Robert Ruohtula (1911–1914)
 Pekka Saarelainen (1909–1910)
 Ernst Saari (1914–1918)
 Iisakki Saha (1914–1917)
 Julius Saraste
 Aale Sariola
 Juho Seppä-Murto
 Wilho Sipilä
 Mikko Sipponen
 Anshelm Sjöstedt-Jussila (1911–1918)
 Mikael Soininen 
 Allan Särkilahti 
 August Tanttu (1918–1918) (defected from  People's Party  and later to National Coalition Party group)
 Vili Taskinen
 Matti Tervaniemi (1907–1908)
 Juho Torppa (1907–1914)
 Elias Tukia (1917–1918)
 Antti Tulenheimo (1914–1917)
 Juho Tulikoura (1907–1914)  (defected to Agrarian League group)
 Mauri Tuomela (1914–1917)
 Antti Tuomikoski
 Leonard Typpö (1911–1918)
 Juho Vaarala
 Iisakki Vahe
 Wäinö Valkama (1914–1917, 1917–1918)
 Tuomas Vanhala
 Iida Vemmelpuu (1907–1909)
 Artturi Virkkunen (1907–1909, 1910–1911, 1914–1918)
 Paavo Virkkunen (1914–1918)
 Toini Voipio
 Kalle Vuorinen (1912–1914)
 Oskari Vuorivirta
 Kalle Vänniä
 Kaarlo Warvikko (1910–1917)
 Arthur von Weissenberg (1914–1917)
 Johannes Wilskman (1907–1908, 1911–1914)
 Artur Wuorimaa (1907–1910, 1911–1914)
 Juho Ylikorpi (1907–1908)
 Iida Yrjö-Koskinen (1909–1918)
 Lauri Yrjö-Koskinen (1911–1914)
 Sakari Yrjö-Koskinen (1907–1916)
 Yrjö Yrjö-Koskinen (1907–1909, 1910–1911)

Finns Party 

 Sanna Antikainen (2019–)
 Juho Eerola (2011–)
 Simon Elo (2015–2017) (formed a new New Alternative group )
 Ritva "Kike" Elomaa (2011–2017, 2017–) (formed a new New Alternative group; re-joined subsequently)
 Tiina Elovaara (2015–2017) (formed a new New Alternative group )
 Teuvo Hakkarainen (2011–2019)
 Jussi Halla-aho (2011–2014, 2019–)
 Tony Halme (2003–2007)
 Lauri Heikkilä (2011–2015)
 James Hirvisaari (2011–2013)  (formed a new Change2011 group )
 Reijo Hongisto (2011–2017) (formed a new New Alternative group )
 Laura Huhtasaari (2015–2019)
 Petri Huru (2019–)
 Olli Immonen (2011–)
 Ari Jalonen (2011–2017) (formed a new New Alternative group )
 Anssi Joutsenlahti (2011–2015)
 Vilhelm Junnila (2019–)
 Johanna Jurva (2011–2015)
 Kaisa Juuso (2019–)
 Arja Juvonen (2011–2017, 2017–) (formed a new Parliamentary Group Juvonen; re-joined subsequently)
 Pietari Jääskeläinen (2009–2015)
 Toimi Kankaanniemi (2015–)
 Pentti Kettunen (2011–2015)
 Kimmo Kivelä (2011–2017) (formed a new New Alternative group )
 Osmo Kokko (2011–2015)
 Ari Koponen (2019–)
 Jari Koskela (2019–)
 Laila Koskela (2011–2014) (defected to Centre Party group )
 Jouni Kotiaho (2019–)
 Kari Kulmala (2015–2017) (formed a new New Alternative group )
 Kristian Sheikki Laakso (2019–)
 Rami Lehto (2015–)
 Jari Lindström (2011–2017) (formed a new New Alternative group )
 Maria Lohela (2011–2017) (formed a new New Alternative group )
 Anne Louhelainen (2011–2017) (formed a new New Alternative group )
 Mikko Lundén (2019–)
 Pirkko Mattila (2011–2017) (formed a new New Alternative group )
 Leena Meri (2015–)
 Juha Mäenpää (2019–)
 Jani Mäkelä (2015–)
 Lea Mäkipää (2011–2017) (formed a new New Alternative group )
 Jukka Mäkynen (2019–)
 Hanna Mäntylä (2011–2017) (formed a new New Alternative group )
 Martti Mölsä (2011–2017) (formed a new New Alternative group )
 Veijo Niemi (2019–)
 Mika Niikko (2011–)
 Jussi Niinistö (2011–2017) (formed a new New Alternative group )
 Pentti Oinonen (2007–2017) (formed a new New Alternative group )
 Tom Packalén (2011–)
 Mauri Peltokangas (2019–)
 Mika Raatikainen (2014–2019)
 Sakari Puisto (2019–)
 Riikka Purra (2019–)
 Lulu Ranne (2019–)
 Mari Rantanen (2019–)
 Minna Reijonen (2019–)
 Jari Ronkainen (2015–)
 Veera Ruoho (2015–2017) (formed a new Parliamentary Group Ruoho)
 Pirkko Ruohonen-Lerner (2007–2015)
 Vesa-Matti Saarakkala (2011–2017) (formed a new New Alternative group )
 Sami Savio (2015–)
 Jenna Simula (2019–)
 Riikka Slunga-Poutsalo (2019–)
 Timo Soini (2003–2009, 2011–2017) (formed a new New Alternative group )
 Ismo Soukola (2011–2015)
 Ville Tavio (2015–)
 Sampo Terho (2015–2017) (formed a new New Alternative group )
 Maria Tolppanen (2011–2016) (defected to Social Democratic Party group )
 Reijo Tossavainen (2011–2015)
 Ano Turtiainen (2019–)
 Kaj Turunen (2011–2017) (formed a new New Alternative group )
 Kauko Tuupainen (2011–2015)
 Sebastian Tynkkynen (2019–)
 Markku Uusipaavalniemi (2010–2011) (defected from Centre Party group )
 Veikko Vallin (2019–)
 Pertti "Veltto" Virtanen (2007–2015)
 Raimo Vistbacka (1995–2011)
 Ville Vähämäki (2011–)
 Juha Väätäinen (2011–2015)
 Jussi Wihonen (2019–)

Free Democrats 
 Urpo Leppänen 1989–1990  (defected from Rural Party and later to Liberal People's Party group)

Green League 

 Touko Aalto (2015–2019)
 Outi Alanko-Kahiluoto (2007–)
 Janina Andersson (1995–2011)
 Ulla Anttila (1991–2007)
 Tuija Brax (1995–2015)
 Tarja Cronberg (2003–2007)
 Tiina Elo (2019–)
 Bella Forsgrén (2019–)
 Merikukka Forsius (1999–2008) (defected to National Coalition Party group)
 Satu Haapanen (2011–2015)
 Pekka Haavisto (1987–1995, 2007–)
 Hanna Halmeenpää (2015–2019)
 Atte Harjanne (2019–)
 Satu Hassi (1991–2004, 2015–)
 Heidi Hautala (1991–1995, 2003–2009)
 Hanna Holopainen (2019–)
 Mari Holopainen (2019–)
 Inka Hopsu (2019–)
 Saara Hyrkkö (2019–)
 Timo Juurikkala (2009–2011)
 Heli Järvinen (2007–2011, 2015–)
 Emma Kari (2015–)
 Johanna Karimäki (2007–2019)
 Jyrki Kasvi (2003–2011, 2015–2019)
 Noora Koponen (2019–)
 Irina Krohn (1995–2006)
 Ville Komsi (1983–1987)
 Kalle Könkkölä (1983–1987)
 Hannele Luukkainen (1991–1995)
 Rosa Meriläinen (2003–2007)
 Rauha-Maria Mertjärvi (1998–2007)
 Krista Mikkonen (2015–)
 Ville Niinistö (2007–2019)
 Paavo Nikula (1991–1998)
 Maria Ohisalo (2019–)
 Kirsi Ojansuu (1999–2011)
 Eero Paloheimo (1987–1995)
 Olli-Poika Parviainen (2015–2019)
 Pirkka-Pekka Petelius (2019–)
 Jenni Pitko (2019–)
 Tuija Maaret Pykäläinen (1991–1999)
 Erkki Pulliainen (1987–2011)
 Pekka Räty (1991–1995)
 Anni Sinnemäki (1999–2015)
 Mirka Soinikoski (2019–)
 Osmo Soininvaara (1987–1991, 1995–2007, 2011–2015)
 Johanna Sumuvuori (2006–2011, 2015)
 Iiris Suomela (2019–)
 Jani Toivola (2011–2019)
 Oras Tynkkynen (2004–2015)
 Antero Vartia (2015–2019)
 Sofia Virta (2019–)
 Ozan Yanar (2015–2019)

Group Erlund 
 Rainer Erlund (1999–2000) (defected from Swedish People's Party group)

Hannu Suhonen Parliamentary group 
 Hannu Suhonen (1994–1995) (formed new group; left the Rural Party group)

Independent or Non-partisans
 Tina Mäkelä (1994–1995) (defected from Rural Party group)

Left Alliance 

 Li Andersson (2015–)
 Paavo Arhinmäki (2007–)
 Raila Aho (1990–1995) (defected from People's Democratic League  group)
 Claes Andersson (1990–1999, 2007–2008) (defected from People's Democratic League  group)
 Asko Apukka (1990–1998) (defected from People's Democratic League  group)
 Heli Astala (1990–1995) (defected from People's Democratic League  group)
 Esko Helle (1990–2003) (defected from People's Democratic League  group)
 Veronika Honkasalo (2019–)
 Anne Huotari (1995–2007)
 Terttu Huttu-Juntunen (1995–1999)
 Matti Huutola (1998–2003)
 Katja Hänninen (2014–)
 Mikko Immonen (1995–2007)
 Anna-Liisa Jokinen (1990–1991) (defected from People's Democratic League  group)
 Risto Kalliorinne (2011–2015, 2019)
 Matti Kangas (1999–2011)
 Matti Kauppila (2003–2011)
 Juho Kautto (2019–)
 Arvo Kemppainen (1990–1991) (defected from People's Democratic League  group)
 Mai Kivelä (2019–)
 Anna Kontula (2011–)
 Martti Korhonen (1991–2015)
 Mikko Kuoppa (1995–1995, 1999–2011)   (left the Leftist Group)
 Merja Kyllönen (2007–2014, 2019–)
 Jaakko Laakso (1991–2011)
 Timo Laaksonen (1990–1999) (defected from People's Democratic League  group)
 Pertti Lahtinen (1990–1991) (defected from People's Democratic League  group)
 Reino Laine (1996–1999)
 Annika Lapintie (1995–2019)
 Pekka Leppänen (1990–1999) (defected from People's Democratic League  group)
 Ensio Laine (1990–1995) (left the Democratic Alternative to  Left Alliance )
 Pia Lohikoski (2019–)
 Marja-Liisa Löyttyjärvi (1990–1991) (left the Democratic Alternative to  Left Alliance )
 Silvia Modig (2011–2019)
 Markus Mustajärvi (2003–2011, 2015–)(left the Left Group)
 Jari Myllykoski (2011–)
 Lauha Männistö (1990–1991) (defected from People's Democratic League group)
 Outi Ojala (1991–1996, 1999–2007)
 Aino-Kaisa Pekonen (2011–)
 Iivo Polvi (1991–2007)
 Osmo Polvinen (1991–1995)
 Veijo Puhjo (1995–1995, 1999–2011) (left the Leftist Group to Parliamentary Group Puhjo and later to Leftist Group)
 Eila Rimmi (1991–1999)
 Pekka Saarnio (1996–1999)
 Jussi Saramo (2019–)
 Hanna Sarkkinen (2015–)
 Matti Semi (2015–)
 Esko Seppänen (1990–1996) (defected from People's Democratic League group)
 Suvi-Anne Siimes (1999–2007)
 Minna Sirnö (2003–2011)
 Marjatta Stenius-Kaukonen (1990–1995, 1999–2003) (left the Democratic Alternative to Left Alliance )
 Katja Syvärinen (1999–2007)
 Vappu Säilynoja (1990–1991) (defected from People's Democratic League group)
 Esko-Juhani Tennilä (1990–1995, 1999–2011) (left the Democratic Alternative to  Left Alliance and later to Leftist Group)
 Eila Tiainen (2011–2015)
 Pentti Tiusanen (1995–2011)
 Pertti Turtiainen (1999–2003)
 Pauli Uitto (1990–1991) (defected from People's Democratic League  group)
 Kari Uotila (1995–2007, 2008–2019)
 Unto Valpas (1999–2011)
 Erkki Virtanen (2003–2015)
 Jorma Vokkolainen (1995–2001)
 Juhani Vähäkangas (1990–1995) (defected from People's Democratic League  group)
 Jarmo Wahlström (1990–1999) (defected from People's Democratic League  group)
 Johannes Yrttiaho (2019–)
 Jyrki Yrttiaho (2007–2011) (left the Left Alliance to Left Group )

Left group 
 Markus Mustajärvi (2011–2015) (formed new group; left the Left Alliance)
 Jyrki Yrttiaho (2011–2015) (formed new group; left the Left Alliance)

Leftist Group 
 Mikko Kuoppa (1995–1999 )  (formed new group; left the Left Alliance)
 Veijo Puhjo (1996–1999) (formed new group; left the Left Alliance)
 Esko-Juhani Tennilä (1995–1999) (formed new group; left the Left Alliance)

Liberal People's Party / Liberals 

 Pirkko Aro (1966–1973)
 Arne Berner (1966–1972)
 Olavi Borg (1972–1975)
 Kerttu Hemmi (1970–1979)
 Armi Hosia (1965–1966)
 Helvi Hyrynkangas (1979–1983)
 Veikko Hyytiäinen (1965–1966)
 Jaakko Itälä (1979–1983)
 Mikko Juva (1965–1966)
 Esa Kaitila (1965–1966)
 Seppo Kanerva (2002–2003)
 Irma Karvikko (1965–1970)
 Anneli Kivitie, later became Kivitie-Koskinen (1975–1983)
 Aili Laitinen (1972–1975)
 Eeles Landström (1966–1972)
 Armas Leinonen (1965–1970)
 Urpo Leppänen (1990–1991) (defected to Free Democrats group)
 Antti Linna (1965–1966)
 Leo Mattila (1965–1966)
 Terhi Nieminen, later became Nieminen-Mäkynen (1975–1983)
 Eino Ojajärvi (1962–1966)
 Juhani Orrenmaa (1975–1979)
 E.J. Paavola (1965–1970)
 Pentti Pakarinen (1962–1966)
 Pekka Pesola (1966–1972)
 Tuure Salo (1965–1970)
 Juhani Sipiläinen (1975–1979)
 Aaro Stykki (1965–1966)
 Pekka Tarjanne (1970–1977)
 Juho Tenhiälä (1965–1966)
 Irma Toivanen (1970–1979)
 Tuulikki Ukkola (1991–1995)
 Seppo Westerlund (1970–1979)
 Osmo Wiio (1975–1979)

Liberal Swedish Party 
 Georg Schauman (1919–1930)
 Max Sergelius (1926–1939, 1945–1948)
 Georg von Wendt (1919–1922)

Liike Nyt
 Harry "Hjallis" Harkimo (2018–) (formed new group; left the National Coalition Party)
 Maria Lohela (2019) (left the Blue Reform)

Member of Parliament Väyrynen
 Paavo Väyrynen (2018) (formed new group; left the Centre Party; later formed the Citizens' Party's parliamentary group)

National Coalition Party 
1900s and 1910s 

 Pekka Ahmavaara (1918–1919)
 Eveliina Ala-Kulju (1918–1919)
 Ivar Alanen (1918–1919)
 Juho Erkki Antila 
 Juhani Arajärvi (1919–1922)
 Gustaf Arokallio (1918–1919)
 Waldemar Bergroth (1918–1919, 1922–1927)
 Mikko Erich (1919–1922)
 Rafael Erich (1919–1924)
 Hedvig Gebhard (1919–1922, 1924–1929)
 Kyösti Haataja (1918–1919, 1929–1930)
 Ilmi Hallsten (1919–1922)
 Edvard Hannula (1919–1922)
 Artturi Hiidenheimo (1919–1927)
 Elli Hiidenheimo (1918–1922, 1924–1927)
 Kaarlo Holma (1919–1922)
 Theodor Homén (1919–1922)
 Tekla Hultin (1918–1924)
 August Hyöki (1918–1919)
 Kalle Häkkinen
 Janne Ihamuotila (1919–1922)
 Lauri Ingman (1918–1919, 1922–1929)
 Mikko Jaskari (1920–1927)
 Taave Junnila (1922–1936)
 Väinö Juustila (1918–1922)
 Erkki Kaila (1918–1922)
 Oswald Kairamo (1918–1919)
 Kaarlo Kares (1922–1927) (defected to Patriotic People's Movement group)
 Edvard Kilpeläinen (1922–1927, 1929–1933, 1936–1939)
 Aleksanteri Koivisto (1918–1921)
 Emanuel Kolkki (1930–1933)
 Matti Kotila
 Arthur Lagerlöf (1918–1919)
 Kaarlo Lanne (1918–1922)
 Elli Laurila (1919–1919)
 Wilho Louhivuori 
 Wilhelmi Malmivaara (1918–1920)
 Juho Mannermaa (1922–1927)
 Matti Mannonen (1919–1922)
 Jalmari Meurman (1919–1919)
 Ernst Nevanlinna (1918–1922)
 Ville Nikkanen (1919–1933)
 Oskar Nissinen 
 Aapo Nuora (1922–1924)
 Johannes Nyberg (1919–1924)
 Pekka Paavolainen (1918–1919)
 Pekka Pennanen (1922–1945)
 Matti Pesonen (1922–1924)
 Oskari Peurakoski
 Bror Hannes Päivänsalo (1918–1919, 1929–1933)
 Juho Rannikko (1922–1927)
 Onni Rantasalo (1918–1919)
 Heikki Renvall (1922–1924)
 Heikki Repo (1918–1919)
 Alfred Retulainen (1918–1919)
 Juuso Runtti (1918–1919)
 Emil Nestor Setälä (1918–1927)
 Anshelm Sjöstedt-Jussila (1918–1919, 1924–1925)
 Juho Snellman (1918–1922)
 Hugo Suolahti (1919–1922)
 Pehr Evind Svinhufvud (1930–1931)
 Onni Talas (1918–1919, 1927–1930)
 August Tanttu (1918–1919, 1922–1924) (defected  from Finnish Party group)
 Elias Tukia (1918–1919)
 Antti Tulenheimo (1922–1924, 1930–1933)
 Leonard Typpö (1918–1922)
 Wäinö Valkama 
 Tuomas Vanhala (1918–1919, 1922–1927)
 Artturi H. Virkkunen (1918–1922)
 Paavo Virkkunen (1918–1936, 1939–1945)
 Iida Yrjö-Koskinen (1918–1919)

1920s

 Toivo Aalto-Setälä (1927–1929, 1930–1933)
 Ernesti Aarnio (1927–1929)
 Arvi Ahmavaara (1929–1930, 1945–1954)
 Sakari Ainali (1924–1929, 1930–1933)
 Alex Alfthan
 Albert Eerola (1924–1927, 1939–1945)
 Leo Gummerus (1927–1929)
 Oskari Heikinheimo (1922–1927, 1941–1945)
 Bernhard Heikkilä (1924–1930)
 Maija Häkkinen (1929–1933)
 Frans Härmä (1922–1929)
 Jaakko Ikola (1927–1930, 1939–1945)
 Oskari Jussila (1922–1929, 1930–1933)
 Kyösti Järvinen (1922–1930)
 Juho Kinnunen 
 Väinö Kivi (1929–1930)
 Erkki Kuokkanen (1927–1933)
 Wiljo-Kustaa Kuuliala (1927–1933)
 Kustaa Kylänpää (1922–1924, 1925–1929, 1936–1945)
 Antero Lamminen (1929–1933)
 Emil Lehtinen (1927–1929)
 Oskari Lehtonen (1927–1929, 1930–1933, 1936–1945, 1948–1954, 1958–1962)
 Aukusti Luoma (1927–1930)
 Aina Lähteenoja (1929–1930)
 Väinö Malmivaara (1927–1933)
 Kaapro Moilanen (1927–1945)
 Aukusti Neitiniemi (1924–1929)
 Evert Nukari (1924–1930)
 Kaino Oksanen (1927–1939)
 Erkki Paavolainen (1924–1927, 1929–1933, 1936–1951)
 Väinö Pastell (1927–1929)
 Johannes Peltonen (1922–1927)
 Lauri Pohjala (1924–1927)
 Hermanni Pojanluoma (1922–1927, 1930–1933)
 Yrjö Puhakka (1927–1928, 1929–1930)
 Yrjö Pulkkinen (1922–1929)
 Martti Rantanen (1927–1929, 1930–1935)
 Siviä Ruotzi (1924–1927)
 Armas Saastamoinen (1924–1926)
 Gunnar Sahlstein (1927–1933)
 Jooseppi Seppänen 
 Veli Kustaa Simelius (1922–1924)
 Eva Somersalo (1924–1927)
 Eino Tulenheimo (1922–1927)
 Samuli Tuomikoski (1929–1933)
 Ernsti Aleksanteri Turja (1924–1933, 1939–1951)
 Antti Vainio (1928–1929)
 Jalmari Viljanen
 Olli Pekka Zitting (1926–1927)

1930s and  1940s

 Reino Ala-Kulju (1952–1954, 1959–1966)
 Heikki Ala-Mäyry (1948–1951)
 Yrjö Antila (1945–1951)
 Kaarlo Anttila (1930–1933)
 Margit Borg-Sundman (1948–1954, 1958–1970)
 Leo Böök (1933–1939)
 Antti Hackzell (1939–1945)
 Jaakko Hakala (1945–1956)
 Irma Hamara (1948–1958, 1966–1970)
 Eemeli Harja (1936–1939)
 Väinö Havas (1939–1941)
 Matti Heikkilä (1939–1954)
 Juho Heitto (1948–1954)
 Päiviö Hetemäki (1945–1962)
 Yrjö Hirvensalo (1938–1939)
 Aarne Honka (1933–1939, 1948–1951)
 Niilo Honkala (1945–1958)
 Toivo Horelli (1933–1945)
 Kaarlo Huhtala (1930–1933)
 Mikko Hurtta (1939–1945)
 Rakel Jalas (1948–19512)
 Lauri Järvi (1945–1948, 1954–1958)
 Kaiku Kallio (1939–1945)
 Alli Kallioniemi (1930–1933)
 Kosti Kankainen (1945–1948)
 Lauri Kaukamaa (1948–1951)
 Eero Kivelä (1945–1948)
 Erkki Koivisto (1945–1966)
 Väinö Kokko (1936–1943)
 Paavo Korpisaari (1930–1933)
 Aku Korvenoja (1933–1936, 1939–1945)
 Yrjö Koskelainen (1931–1933)
 Aleksanteri Koskenheimo (1930–1933)
 Usko Koski (1948–1951)
 Martti O. Kölli (1945–1954)
 Jussi Lappi-Seppälä (1945–1954)
 Kustaa Lehtonen (1933–1936, 1943–1954)
 Erkki Leikola (1945–1951, 1954–1962)
 Yrjö Leiwo (1930–1936)
 Leo Leppä (1945–1948)
 Edwin Linkomies (1933–1945)
 Arvo Lintulahti (1936–1939)
 Tatu Malmivaara (1945–1948)
 Lauri Mäkelä (1930–1933)
 Eero Mäkinen (1945–1951)
 Iisakki Nikkola  (1951–1952)
 Hugo Nuorsaari (1948–1954)
 Arvi Oksala (1930–1949)
 Erkki Perheentupa (1930–1933)
 Emil Pesonen (1930–1933)
 Martti Pihkala (1930–1933)
 Jalmari Pilkama (1930–1933)
 Kyllikki Pohjala (1933–1962)
 Arvo Pohjannoro (1936–1948)
 Jalmari Pusa 
 Emil Rautaharju
 Hilja Riipinen (1930–1933) (defected to Patriotic People's Movement group)
 Urho Saariaho (1945–1966)
 Arvo Salminen (1941–1948, 1954–1958)
 Jussi Saukkonen (1949–1951, 1958–1966)
 Felix Seppälä (1945–1958)
 Kalle Soini (1933–1945)
 Niilo Solja (1930–1933)
 Kaarlo Sovijärvi (1930–1933)
 Oiva Turunen (1948–1951, 1962–1966)
 Arno Tuurna (1939–1958)
 Eetu Vaarama (1933–1938)
 Teuvo Valanne (1942–1948)
 Helena Virkki (1945–1954)
 Toivo Wiherheimo (1948–1966)
 Johannes Wirtanen (1945–1959)
 Matti Ytti (1945–1948)

1950s and 1960s

 Aksel Airo (1958–1966)
 Jouni Apajalahti (1966–1970)
 Mikko Asunta (1958–1970, 1972–1979)
 Olli Aulanko (1958–1964)
 Saara Forsius (1954–1970)
 Pekka Haarla (1966–1972)
 Raino Hallberg (1951–1966)
 Erkki Hara (1958–1972)
 Toivo Hietala (1958–1970)
 Sakari Huima (1966–1970)
 Martti Huttunen (1951–1956)
 Erkki Huurtamo (1962–1975)
 Juuso Häikiö (1962–1983)
 Raimo Ilaskivi (1962–1975)
 Aune Innala (1951–1962)
 Tuure Junnila (1951–1962, 1966–1979, 1983–1987, 1990–1991)
 Jaakko Kemppainen (1958–1970)
 Esko Koppanen (1962–1983)
 Niilo Kosola (1951–1970)
 Väinö Kuoppala (1962–1963)
 Anna-Liisa Linkola (1962–1979)
 Olavi Lähteenmäki (1958–1975)
 Pentti Mäki-Hakola (1966–1995)
 Timo Mäki (1964–1979)
 Väinö Nieminen (1958–1966)
 Olavi Nikkilä (1966–1975, 1979–1983)
 Matti Raipala (1954–1970)
 Paavo Rautkallio (1962–1966)
 Juha Rihtniemi (1958–1971)
 Tuomas Saikku (1956–1958)
 Martti Salminen (1956–1962)
 Kalervo Saura (1951–1966)
 Mauri Seppä (1954–1962, 1970–1975)
 Aapo Seppälä (1962–1966)
 Pentti Sillantaus (1962–1972, 1975–1983)
 Erkki Tuuli (1954–1966)
 Alli Vaittinen-Kuikka (1966–1979)
 Martti Valkama (1963–1966)
 Tauno Vartia (1966–1975)

1970s and 1980s

 Sampsa Aaltio (1979–1987)
 Anna-Kaarina Aalto (1971–1972)
 Aslak Aas (1970–1972)
 Kirsti Ala-Harja (1987–1999)
 Pirjo-Riitta Antvuori (1987–1995, 1996–2003)
 Kaarina Dromberg (1983–2007)
 Matti Hakala (1979–1983)
 Maija Heino-Vesihiisi (1970–1972)
 Elsi Hetemäki-Olander (1970–1991)
 Liisa Hilpelä (1983–1991)
 Matti Hokkanen (1972–1983, 1987–1991)
 Harri Holkeri (1970–1979)
 Kirsti Hollming (1975–1978)
 Tapio Holvitie (1979–1991)
 Erkki Häkämies (1970–1979)
 Kari Häkämies (1987–1998)
 Timo Ihamäki (1979–1983, 1993–2003)
 Olli Ikkala (1987–1991)
 Lauri Impiö (1974–1987)
 Matti Jaatinen (1970–1984)
 Heikki Jartti (1975–1979)
 Aila Jokinen (1979–1983)
 Pekka Jokinen (1972–1983)
 Riitta Jouppila (1983–1995)
 Vuokko Juhola (1978–1979)
 Heikki Järvenpää (1979–1991, 1998–1999)
 Keijo Jääskeläinen (1987–1991)
 Ilkka Kanerva (1975–)
 Salme Katajavuori (1970–1973) (defected to Constitutional People's Party group)
 Eeva Kauppi (1970–1983)
 Orvokki Kauppila (1970–1972)
 Riitta Kauppinen (1994–1995) (defected from Centre Party group)
 Maunu Kohijoki (1987–1995)
 Juho Koivisto (1983–1987)
 Martti Korkia-Aho (1987–1991)
 Eeva Kuuskoski (1979–1980) (defected from Centre Party group)
 Lea Kärhä (1983–1991)
 Gunnar Laatio (1970–1975)
 Matti Lahtinen (1984–1995)
 Juhani Laitinen (1979–1983, 1987–1991)
 Kalevi Lamminen (1987–1999, 2003–2007)
 Arto Lampinen (1974–1983)
 Sirkka Lankinen (1970–1975)
 Eero Lattula (1972–1983)
 Ritva Laurila (1978–1995)
 Sinikka Linkomies-Pohjala (1970–1983)
 Tuula Linnainmaa (1987–1997)
 Anna-Kaarina Louvo (1989–1995)
 Pekka Löyttyniemi (1979–1985)
 Mauri Miettinen (1972–1993)
 Saara Mikkola (1975–1987)
 Erkki Moisander (1983–1987)
 Jouni Mykkänen (1970–1975)
 Toivo Mäkynen (1979–1983)
 Tapani Mörttinen (1975–1983, 1987–1991)
 Sauli Niinistö (1987–2003, 2007–2011)
 Heikki A. Ollila (1987–1995, 2003–2011)
 Matti Pelttari (1978–1983)
 Heikki Perho (1975–1991)
 Helena Pesola (1979–1991)
 Tuulikki Petäjäniemi (1979–1987)
 Sirpa Pietikäinen (1983–2003)
 Toivo T. Pohjala (1975–1987)
 Aino Pohjanoksa (1983–1991)
 Eva Pukkio (1979–1983)
 Ulla Puolanne (1975–1991)
 Erkki Pystynen (1975–1991)
 Kullervo Rainio (1972–1978)  (defected to Constitutional People's Party group)
 Anssi Rauramo (1987–1998)
 Irma Rihtniemi-Koski (1975–1981) 
 Pirjo Rusanen (1983–1995)
 Helge Saarikoski (1979–1987)
 Riitta Saastamoinen (1987–1995)
 Antero Salmenkivi (1970–1979)
 Pertti Salolainen (1970–1996, 2007–2019)
 Markku Salonen (1975–1977)
 Kimmo Sasi (1983–2015)
 Oiva Savela (1987–1999)
 Eva-Riitta Siitonen (1983–1989)
 Ilkka Suominen (1970–1975, 1983–1994)
 Sami Suominen (1970–1975)
 Jouni J. Särkijärvi (1987–2003)
 Eeva Särkkä (1970–1972)
 Anneli Taina (1987–1999)
 Niilo Tarvajärvi (1970–1972)
 Martti Tiuri (1983–2003)
 Jalmari Torikka (1977–1983)
 Eeva Turunen (1983–1995)
 Riitta Uosukainen (1983–2003)
 Martti Ursin (1979–1983)
 Sakari Valli (1983–1991)
 Tauno Valo (1979–1991)
 Päivi Varpasuo (1985–1999)
 Ritva Vastamäki (1987–1991)
 Iiro Viinanen (1983–1996)
 Juha Vikatmaa (1970–1974)
 Matti Viljanen (1979–1991)
 Mauri Vänskä (1979–1983)
 Ben Zyskowicz (1979–)

1990s and 2000s

 Eero Akaan-Penttilä (1999–2011)
 Sirpa Asko-Seljavaara (2003–2011)
 Matti Aura (1995–1999)
 Merikukka Forsius (2008–2011)  (defected from Green League group)
 Juha Hakola (2007–2011)
 Leena Harkimo (1999–2015)
 Olli-Pekka Heinonen (1995–2002)
 Timo Heinonen (2007–)
 Pertti Hemmilä (1999–2015)
 Hanna-Leena Hemming (2003–2011)
 Anne Holmlund (2002–2015)
 Jyri Häkämies (1999–2012)
 Ville Itälä (1995–2004)
 Harri Jaskari (2007–2019)
 Kalle Jokinen (2009–)
 Marjut Kaarilahti (1991–1999)
 Seppo Kanerva (1996–2002)
 Kari Kantalainen (1995–2003) 
 Minna Karhunen (1991–1999)
 Arja Karhuvaara (2007–2011)
 Juha Karpio (1995–2003)
 Marjukka Karttunen (1999–2007)
 Ulla Karvo (2007–2011)
 Jyrki Katainen (1999–2014)
 Sampsa Kataja (2007–2015)
 Pekka Kivelä (1993–1995)
 Anne Knaapi (1995–1999)
 Paula Kokkonen (1995–2003)
 Riitta Korhonen (1995–2003)
 Heikki Koskinen (1995–1999)
 Jari Koskinen (1996–2009)
 Kalervo Kummola (1995–2003)
 Pekka Kuosmanen (1999–2007)
 Osmo Kurola (1995–1999)
 Esko Kurvinen (1999–2007, 2011–2015)
 Seppo Lahtela (2006–2007)  (defected from Centre Party group)
 Jere Lahti (2003–2007)
 Jari Larikka (2007–2011)
 Sanna Lauslahti (2007–2018)
 Jouko Laxell (2004–2011)
 Eero Lehti (2007–2019)
 Jouni Lehtimäki (1999–2003)
 Leila Lehtinen (1991–1995)
 Sirkka Lekman (1998–1999)
 Suvi Lindén (1995–2011)
 Hanna Markkula-Kivisilta (1991–2003)
 Markku Markkula (1995–2003)
 Marjo Matikainen-Kallström (2003–2015)
 Pertti Mäki-Hakola (1999–2003)
 Tapani Mäkinen (2003–2004, 2007–2015)
 Jukka Mäkelä (2007–2010)
 Outi Mäkelä (2007–2018)
 Olli Nepponen (1999–2011)
 Tuija Nurmi (1995–2011)
 Petteri Orpo (2007–)
 Reijo Paajanen (2003–2011)
 Maija Perho (1991–2007)
 Sanna Perkiö (2007–2011)
 Kirsi Piha (1994–1996, 1999–2003)
 Petri Pihlajaniemi (2007–2011)
 Lyly Rajala (2003–2011)  (defected from Christian Democratic Party group)
 Pekka Ravi (1999–2003, 2007–2015)
 Paula Risikko (2003–)
 Martin Saarikangas (2003–2007)
 Väinö Saario (1991–1996)
 Petri Salo (1999–2011)
 Sari Sarkomaa (1999–)
 Arto Satonen (2003–)
 Timo Seppälä (1999–2007)
 Outi Siimes (1996–1999)
 Juhani Sjöblom (1999–2007)
 Irmeli Takala (1991–1995)
 Marja Tiura (1999–2011)
 Lenita Toivakka (2007–2019)
 Kyösti Toivonen (1991–1995)
 Irja Tulonen (1995–2007)
 Tuulikki Ukkola (2007–2011)
 Raija Vahasalo (1999–2015, 2018–2019)
 Jan Vapaavuori (2003–2015)
 Ahti Vielma (2003–2007)
 Jari Vilén (1999–2007)
 Ilkka Viljanen (2007–2011)
 Lasse Virén (1999–2007, 2010–2011)
 Henna Virkkunen (2007–2014)
 Anne-Mari Virolainen (2007–)

2010s

 Heikki Autto (2011–2015, 2019–)
 Markku Eestilä (2011–)
 Sanni Grahn-Laasonen (2011–)
 Harry "Hjallis" Harkimo (2015–2018) (later formed the Liike Nyt's parliamentary group)
 Janne Heikkinen (2019–)
 Antti Häkkänen (2015–)
 Anna-Kaisa Ikonen (2019–)
 Pia Kauma (2011–2015, 2017–)
 Ville Kaunisto (2019–)
 Pihla Keto-Huovinen (2019–)
 Jukka Kopra (2011–)
 Susanna Koski (2015–2019)
 Marko Kilpi (2019–)
 Pauli Kiuru (2011–)
 Terhi Koulumies (2019–)
 Mia Laiho (2018–)
 Jaana Laitinen-Pesola (2015–2019)
 Elina Lepomäki (2014–)
 Matias Marttinen (2019–)
 Sari Multala (2015–)
 Kai Mykkänen (2015–)
 Lasse Männistö (2011–2015)
 Markku Mäntymaa (2011–2015)
 Mikael Palola (2014–2015)
 Jaana Pelkonen (2011–)
 Sari Raassina (2015–2019)
 Veera Ruoho (2017–2019)
 Wille Rydman (2015–)
 Janne Sankelo (2011–2015, 2019–)
 Saara-Sofia Sirén (2015–)
 Ruut Sjöblom (2019–)
 Alexander Stubb (2011–2017)
 Eero Suutari (2011–2019)
 Mari-Leena Talvitie (2015–)
 Kari Tolvanen (2011–)
 Kaj Turunen (2018–2019) (defected from the Blue Reform)
 Anu Urpalainen (2012–2015)
 Juhana Vartiainen (2015–)
 Heikki Vestman (2019–)
 Sofia Vikman (2011–)
 Sinuhe Wallinheimo (2011–)

National Progressive Party 

 Arthur Aspelin (1922–1924)
 Juho Astala (1918–1919) (defected from Young Finnish Party group)
 Ilmari Auer (1919–1922, 1924–1927)
 Rolf B. Berner (1945–1951)  
 Helena Brander (1918–1919) (defected from Young Finnish Party group)
 Uuno Brander (1924–1927, 1930–1933) (defected from Young Finnish Party group)
 Aimo Cajander (1929–1943)
 Mikko Collan (1919–1920)
 Eljas Erkko (1933–1936)
 Aleksanteri Fränti (1919–1922, 1934–1936) (defected from Young Finnish Party group)
 Mandi Hannula (1919–1930, 1936–1945)
 Eva Heikinheimo (1925–1927)
 Taavetti Heimonen (1918–1920) (defected from People's Party group)
 Sulo Heiniö (1933–1936, 1939–1948)
 Lassi Hiekkala (1945–1951)
 Gabriel Hirvensalo (1922–1924) (defected from Young Finnish Party group)
 Vilho Hirvensalo (1924–1927)
 Rudolf Holsti (1922) (defected from Young Finnish Party group)
 August Hämäläinen (1919–1922)
 Pekka Toivo Ikonen (1922–1924) (defected from Young Finnish Party group)
 Arvo Inkilä (1933–1938)
 Aaro Jaskari (1922–1925)
 Emil Jatkola (1930–1933)
 Jalmari Jyske (1919–1921, 1924–1927, 1930–1933)
 Teuvo Kaitila (1918–1919) (defected from Young Finnish Party group)
 Heikki Kannisto (1933–1936, 1945–1954 (defected from  Finnish People's Party group)
 Heikki Karjalainen (1927–1929)
 Irma Karvikko (1948–1951) (defected from  Finnish People's Party group)
 Juho Kaskinen (1919–1922, 1930–1932) (defected from Young Finnish Party group)
 Kalle Kauppi (1943–1951)
 Matti Kekki (1919–1922) (defected from Young Finnish Party group)
 Arvo Ketonen (1939–1945)
 Kaaperi Kivialho (1923–1924)
 Toivo Kivimäki (1922, 1924–1927, 1929–1940)
 Rope Kojonen (1919–1922)
 Arvi Kontu (1919–1922)
 Ensio Kytömaa (1945–1948)
 Augusta Laine (1918–1919, 1922) (defected from Young Finnish Party group)
 Eemil Linna (1918–1930) (defected from Young Finnish Party group)
 Hugo Linna (1918–1919) (defected from Young Finnish Party group)
 Johannes Lundson (1918–1919) (defected from Young Finnish Party group)
 Alpo Luostarinen (1922–1927)
 Oskari Mantere (1919–1939)
 Väinö Merivirta (1935–1936)
 Herman Niittynen (1919)
 Akseli Nikula (1940–1945) (defected from Young Finnish Party group)
 Tatu Nissinen (1920–1922)
 Hulda Nordenstreng (1929–1930)
 Antti Penttilä (1922–1924)
 Otto Pesonen (1919) (defected from Young Finnish Party group)
 Albin Pulkkinen (1922–1924)
 Erkki Pullinen (1918–1919, 1922–1927) (defected from People's Party group)
 Heikki Ritavuori  (1919–1922) (defected from Young Finnish Party group)
 Kustaa Ruuskanen (1919–1922)
 Eero Rydman (1927–1929, 1933–1936)
 Risto Ryti (1919–1929)
 Bruno Sarlin (1919–1920, 1930–1936, 1945–1948)
 Aarne Sihvo (1919–1920)
 Elias Sinkko (1918–1922, 1927–1929)
 Mikael Soininen (1919–1922)
 Kaarlo Juho Ståhlberg (1918, 1930–1933)
 Yrjö Suontausta (1945–1947)
 Helena Syrjälä-Eskola (1936–1939, 1940–1945)
 Wille Särkkä (1918–1929, 1930–1936)
 Vili Taskinen (1919, 1920–1922)
 Sulo Teittinen (1939–1948)
 Paul Thuneberg (1918–1919)
 Juhana Toiviainen (1918–1919)
 Urho Toivola (1933–1936)
 Juho Torppa (1919–1922)
 Walto Tuomioja (1924–1929, 1930–1931)
 Toivo Tyrni (1933–1935, 1947–1948)
 Hannes Valkama (1924–1927)
 Matti Valkonen (1919–1922)
 Eemil Vekara (1918–1919)
 Juho Vennola (1919–1930)
 Matti Viljanen (1924–1927)
 Hilja Vilkemaa (1920–1922)
 Kaarlo Vuokoski (1918–1922, 1924–1927) (defected from People's Party group)

New Alternative / Blue Reform 

 Simon Elo (2017–2019) (formed new group; left the Finns Party)
 Ritva "Kike" Elomaa (2017) (formed new group; left the Finns Party; re-joined the Finns Party subsequently)
 Tiina Elovaara (2017–2019) (formed new group; left the Finns Party)
 Reijo Hongisto (2017–2019) (formed new group; left the Finns Party)
 Ari Jalonen (2017–2019) (formed new group; left the Finns Party)
 Kimmo Kivelä (2017–2019) (formed new group; left the Finns Party)
 Kari Kulmala (2017–2019) (formed new group; left the Finns Party)
 Jari Lindström (2017–2019) (formed new group; left the Finns Party)
 Maria Lohela (2017–2019) (formed new group; left the Finns Party; later defected to Liike Nyt)
 Anne Louhelainen (2017–2019) (formed new group; left the Finns Party)
 Pirkko Mattila (2017–2019) (formed new group; left the Finns Party)
 Lea Mäkipää (2017–2019) (formed new group; left the Finns Party)
 Hanna Mäntylä (2017) (formed new group; left the Finns Party)
 Martti Mölsä (2017–2019) (formed new group; left the Finns Party)
 Jussi Niinistö (2017–2019) (formed new group; left the Finns Party)
 Pentti Oinonen (2017–2019) (formed new group; left the Finns Party)
 Vesa-Matti Saarakkala (2017–2019) (formed new group; left the Finns Party)
 Timo Soini (2017–2019) (formed new group; left the Finns Party)
 Sampo Terho (2017–2019) (formed new group; left the Finns Party)
 Matti Torvinen (2017–2019)
 Kaj Turunen (2017–2018) (formed new group; left the Finns Party; later defected to the National Coalition Party)

Parliamentary Group Juvonen 
 Arja Juvonen (2017) (formed new group; left the Finns Party; re-joined the Finns Party subsequently)

Parliamentary Group Puhjo 
 Veijo Puhjo (1995–1996) (formed new group; left the Left Alliance group)

Parliamentary Group Ruoho 
 Veera Ruoho (2017) (formed new group; left the Finns Party; joined the National Coalition Party)

Parliamentary Group Virtanen 
 Pertti "Veltto" Virtanen (1995–1999)

Patriotic People's Movement 

 Reino Ala-Kulju (1932–1939)
 Vilho Annala (1933–1945)
 Reino Cederberg (1942–1945)
 Sakari Honkala (1933–1936)
 Kustaa Jussila (1936–1939)
 Rauno Kallia (1939–1945)
 K. R. Kares (1933–1942) (defected from National Coalition Party group)
 Yrjö Kivenoja (1933–1936)
 Arvi Malmivaara (1935–1939)
 Iisakki Nikkola (1933–1945)
 Hilja Riipinen (1933–1939) 
 Yrjö R. Saarinen (1936–1945)
 Bruno A. Salmiala (1933–1945)
 Kaarlo Salovaara (1936–1939)
 Yrjö Schildt (1933–1936)
 Elias Simojoki (1933–1939)
 Arne Somersalo (1933–1936)
 Paavo Susitaival (1939–1940)
 Pekka Tapaninen (L.P., Pietari) (1933–1936)
 Eino Tuomivaara (1933–1939, 1941–1945)
 Pauli Tuorila (1936–1939)
 J. V. Wainio (1933–1945)

People's Democratic League 

 Aimo Aaltonen (1945–1962)
 Raila Aho (1987–1990) (changed  group to Left Alliance)
 Paavo Aitio (1951–1977)
 Ele Alenius (1966–1977)
 Ulla-Leena Alppi (1976–1987)
 Claes Andersson (1987–1990) (changed  group to Left Alliance))
 Asko Apukka (1987–1990) (changed  group to Left Alliance))
 Heli Astala (1979–1990) (changed  group to Left Alliance))
 Georg Backlund (1953–1954, 1958–1970)
 Ilkka-Christian Björklund (1972–1983)
 Mikko Ekorre (1974–1983)
 Yrjö Enne (1954–1961)
 Toivo Friman (1948–1962, 1966–1970)
 Kelpo Gröndahl (1962–1970)
 Kaino Haapanen (1951–1970, 1974–1975)
 Esko Helle (1983–1990) (changed  group to Left Alliance))
 Johan Helo (1945–1946)
 Esa Hietanen (1942–1962)
 Inger Hirvelä López (1979–1987)
 Kauko Hjerppe (1966–1971, 1975–1978)
 Joel Hongisto (1978–1979)
 Kuuno Honkonen (1958–1979)
 Matti Huhta (1945–1948)
 Juho Hukari (1945–1948)
 Anna-Liisa Hyvönen (1972–1980)
 Esteri Häikiö (1951–1954)
 Anna-Liisa Jokinen (1970–1990) (changed  group to Left Alliance))
 Toivo Jokiniemi (1975–1979)
 Elli Juntunen (1951–1954)
 Aulis Juvela (1966–1983)
 Matti Järvenpää (1970–1983)
 Mikko Järvinen (1945–1953)
 Toivo Järvinen (1945–1947)
 Markus Kainulainen (1975–1979)
 Veikko Kansikas (1959–1962)
 Lauri Kantola (1962–1975)
 Elsa Karppinen (1945–1948)
 Kalle Kauhanen (1945–1949)  (defected from Social Democratic Party group)
 Matti Kautto (1983–1986) (changed  group to Democratic Alternative))
 Tauno Kelovesi (1954–1966)
 Arvo Kemppainen (1979–1990) (changed group to Left Alliance))
 Eino Kilpi (1948–1962)
 Kalevi Kilpi (1962–1966)
 Sylvi-Kyllikki Kilpi (1946–1958) (defected from Social Democratic Party group)
 Antti Kinnunen (1951–1958, 1962–1970)
 Aleksi Kiviaho (1954–1970)
 Kalevi Kivistö (1972–1985)
 Osmo Kock (1966–1970, 1972–1974)
 Matti Koivunen (1951–1971)
 Anna-Liisa Korpinen (1951–1974)
 Rauno Korpinen (1972–1975)
 Niilo Koskenniemi (1970–1987)
 Aarne Koskinen (1970–1983)
 Lyyli Koskinen (1962–1969)
 Veikko Kosonen (1948)
 Toivo Kujala (1945–1959)
 Eino Kujanpää (1945–1951)
 Jalmari Kulmala (1945–1948)
 Mikko Kuoppa (1979–1986) (changed  group to Democratic Alternative))
 Hertta Kuusinen (1945–1972)
 Olavi Kämäräinen (1962–1966)
 Timo Laaksonen (1983–1990) (changed  group to Left Alliance))
 Paavo Lagerroos (1964–1970)
 Pertti Lahtinen (1987–1990) (changed  group to Left Alliance))
 Aimo Laiho (1962–1970)
 Ensio Laine (1968–1986) (changed  group to Democratic Alternative))
 Olavi J. Laine (1966–1970)
 Eemeli Lakkala (1958–1962)
 Siiri Lehmonen (1958–1979)
 Vilho Lehtonen (1945–1948)
 Yrjö Leino (1945–1951)
 Pekka Leppänen (1983–1990) (changed  group to Left Alliance))
 Martti Leskinen (1948–1951, 1954–1958)
 Paavo Leskinen (1945–1952)
 Pentti Liedes (1954–1966, 1970–1983)
 Hemmi Lindqvist (1951–1958)
 Martti Linna (1958–1970)
 Toivo Lång (1945–1948)
 Marja-Liisa Löyttyjärvi (1979–1986) (changed  group to Democratic Alternative))
 Hugo Manninen (1945–1970)
 Yrjö Manninen (1945–1948)
 Hellä Meltti (1961–1962)
 Matti Meriläinen (1945–1954, 1958–1962)
 Arto Merisaari (1975–1978)
 Vihtori Metsäranta (1945–1947)
 Unto Miettinen (1954–1958)
 Yrjö Murto (1948–1963)
 Heikki Mustonen (1966–1979, 1983, 1985–1987)
 Janne Mustonen (1945–1962, 1963–1964)
 Sulo Muuri (1945–1948)
 Lauri Myllymäki (1945–1958)
 Juho Mäkelä (1945–1948, 1958–1966)
 Lauha Männistö (1966–1990) (changed  group to Left Alliance))
 Judit Nederström-Lundén (1951–1966)
 Anna Nevalainen (1945–1954)
 Niilo Nieminen (1948–1951, 1952–1962, 1969–1975)
 Toivo Niiranen (1951–1966)
 Helvi Niskanen (1970–1983)
 Nestori Nurminen (1945–1962, 1966–1970)
 Juho Nykänen (1951–1954)
 Ville Puumalainen (1945–1954)
 Eino Pekkala (1945–1948)
 Mauno Pekkala (1945–1953) (defected from Social Democratic Party group)
 Kati Peltola (1977–1979, 1980–1983, 1985–1987)  
 Mauri Perkonoja (1947–1951)
 Ville Pessi (1945–1966)
 Antto Prunnila (1945–1954, 1958–1962)
 Pauli Puhakka (1954–1983)
 Aarne Pulkkinen (1958–1962, 1962–1970, 1972–1977)
 Terho Pursiainen (1970–1971, 1979–1987)
 Eino Rannikkoluoto (1952–1954)
 Pertti Rapio (1951–1966)
 Heimo Rekonen (1970–1979)
 Kalle Renfors (1948–1954)
 Arvo Riihimäki (1945–1954)
 Ville Riihinen (1945–1951)
 Aleksi Rinne (1945–1948)
 Eino Roine (1945–1951, 1954–1962, 1962–1966)
 Gösta Rosenberg (1945–1966)
 Irma Rosnell (1954–1986) (changed  group to Democratic Alternative))
 Unto Ruotsalainen (1975–1983)
 Kaisu-Mirjami Rydberg (1945–1948)  (defected from Socialistic parliamentary group)
 Juho Rytkönen (1951–1958)
 Veikko I. Rytkönen (1962–1966)
 Veikko J. Rytkönen (1958–1975, 1978–1983)
 Mauri Ryömä (1945–1958)
 Yrjö Räisänen (1945–1948) (defected from Social Democratic Party group)
 Pauli Räsänen (1966–1979)
 Aarne Saarinen (1962–1970, 1972–1983)
 Veikko Saarto (1966–1987)
 Toivo Salin (1958–1966)
 Pekka Salla (1966–1975)
 Veikko Salmi (1970–1975)
 Esko Seppänen (1987–1990) (changed  group to Left Alliance))
 Usko Seppi (1951–1962)
 Pekka Silander (1966–1968)
 Taisto Sinisalo (1962–1979)
 Ilmari Sormunen (1945–1951)
 Elli Stenberg (1945–1966)
 Marjatta Stenius-Kaukonen (1975–1986) (changed group to Democratic Alternative))
 Cay Sundström (1945)  (defected from Social Democratic Party group)
 Oili Suomi (1970–1971, 1977–1978)
 Leo Suonpää (1954–1970)
 Vilho Suosalo (1962–1966)
 Reinhold Svento (1945–1948)  (defected from Social Democratic Party group)
 Vappu Säilynoja (1979–1990) (changed group to Left Alliance))
 Sten Söderström (1979–1986) (changed group to Democratic Alternative))
 Eino Tainio (1945–1970)
 Konsta Talvio (1945–1948)
 Helge Talvitie (1975–1979)
 Kauko Tamminen (1958–1966, 1967–1983)
 Hannes Tauriainen (1948–1966)
 Esko-Juhani Tennilä (1975–1986) (changed group to Democratic Alternative))
 Olga Terho (1945–1948)
 Fabian Tillanen (1947–1948)
 Seppo Toiviainen (1979–1986) (changed group to Democratic Alternative))
 Irma Torvi (1948–1966)
 Mirjam Tuominen (1970–1979)
 Tyyne Tuominen (1945–1948, 1958–1962)
 Pirkko Turpeinen (1983–1986) (changed group to Democratic Alternative))
 Aukusti Turunen (1948)
 Pauli Uitto (1975–1983, 1986–1990) (changed group to Left Alliance))
 Reino Uusisalmi (1945)
 Aaro Uusitalo (1945–1948)
 Osmo Vepsäläinen (1975–1979, 1983–1987)
 Antti Virtanen (1946–1948)
 Inkeri Virtanen (1958–1962)
 Rainer Virtanen (1954–1971)
 Väinö Virtanen (1958–1970)
 Juhani Vähäkangas (1978–1990) (changed group to Left Alliance))
 Jarmo Wahlström (1975–1983, 1987–1990) (changed  group to Left Alliance))
 Kaisu Weckman (1966–1976)
 Karl Wiik (1945–1946) (changed group to Democratic Alternative))
 Atos Wirtanen (1946–1954)  (defected from Social Democratic Party group)
 Hella Wuolijoki (1946–1948)
 Toivo Åsvik (1954–1966, 1970–1975)

People's Party (Agrarian) 
 Taavetti Heimonen (1917–1918) (defected to National Progressive Party group) 
 Erkki Pullinen (1917–1918) (defected from Finnish Party and later to National Progressive Party group) 
 Jussi Puumala (1917–1919)
 August Tanttu (1917–1918) (defected to  Finnish Party  group) 
 Kaarlo Vuokoski (1917–1918) (defected to National Progressive Party group)

People's Party, 1932 
 Yrjö Hautala (1933–1936)
 Heikki Niskanen (1933–1939) (defected to  Small Farmers' Party / Party of the Small Farmers' and the Rural People group)

People's Party, 1951 

 Lassi Hiekkala
 Armi Hosia
 Veikko Hyytiäinen
 Mikko Juva
 Konsti Järnefelt
 Esa Kaitila
 Kaarlo Kajatsalo
 Heikki Kannisto
 Irma Karvikko
 Harras Kyttä
 Aare Leikola
 Armas Leinonen
 Antti Linna
 Leo Mattila
 Helge Miettunen
 Eino Ojajärvi
 Pentti Pakarinen
 Aukusti Pasanen
 Eino Rauste
 Eino Saari
 Tuure Salo
 Aaro Stykki
 Juho Tenhiälä
 Artturi Tienari

People's Unity Party 

 Matti Asunmaa (1972–1977)
 Matti Hannola (1975–1975)
 Kalevi Huotari (1972–1975)
 Heikki Kainulainen (1972–1975)
 Mauno Kurppa (1972–1975)
 Lauri Linna (1972–1975)
 Aune Mänttäri (1972–1975)
 Artturi Niemelä (1972–1975)
 Kalevi Remes (1972–1975)
 Arvo Sainio (1973–1975)
 Viljo Suokas (1972–1975)
 Olavi Tupamäki (1972–1975)
 Hannes Volotinen (1972–1975)

Reform Group 
 Risto Kuisma (1998–2001) (defected from Young Finns and later to  Social Democratic Party group)

Rural Party 

 Sulo Aittoniemi (1987–1994)
 Pentti Antila (1970–1972)
 Riitta-Liisa Arranz (1983–1987)
 Matti Asunmaa (1970–1972)
 Ulla Bogdanoff (1984–1986)
 Vieno Eklund (1982–1987)
 Reijo Enävaara (1983–1984)
 Kalevi Huotari (1970–1972)
 Antti Isomursu (1970–1972)
 Anssi Joutsenlahti (1979–1987)
 Gunnar Joutsensaari (1989–1991)
 Reino Jyrkilä (1983–1987)
 Heikki Kainulainen (1970–1972)
 Pentti Kettunen (1983–1987, 1989–1991)
 J. Juhani Kortesalmi (1970–1989)
 Helvi Koskinen (1983–1987)
 Mauno Kurppa (1970–1972)
 Rainer Lemström (1972–1975)
 Urpo Leppänen (1979–1989)
 Lauri Linna (1970–1972)
 Tina Mäkelä (1987–1994)
 Marita Mäkinen (1987–1995)
 Lea Mäkipää (1983–1995)
 Aune Mänttäri (1970–1972)
 Artturi Niemelä (1970–1972)
 Aarne Penttinen (1970–1972)
 Urho Pohto (1979–1987)
 Eino Poutiainen (1970–1972, 1979)
 Martti Ratu (1983–1986)
 Kalevi Remes (1972–1975)
 Heikki Riihijärvi (1983–1993) (defected to Finnish Front)
 Arvo Sainio (1972–1973)
 Matti Silander (1970–1972)
 Pentti Skön (1983–1987)
 Hannu Suhonen (1991–1994)
 Viljo Suokas (1970–1975)
 Eino Syrjä (1970–1972)
 Olavi Tupamäki (1970–1972)
 Mikko Vainio (1970–1975, 1983–1987)
 Pekka Vennamo (1972–1975, 1979–1989)
 Veikko Vennamo (1959–1962, 1966–1987)
 Raimo Vistbacka (1987–1995) (swifted to the Finns Party)
 Hannes Volotinen (1970–1972)

Seven Star Movement
 Paavo Väyrynen (2018–2019) (formed new group; left the Citizens' Party)

Small Farmers' Party / Party of the Small Farmers' and the Rural People 
 Yrjö Kesti (1930–1936)
 Heikki Niskanen (1939–1941) (defected from People's Party (1932) and later to Agrarian League )
 Sigrid Oulasmaa (1933–1936)
 Eino Rytinki (1933–1941) (defected to Agrarian League )

Social Democratic Party 
1910s

 Pekka Aakula (1909–1911, 1914–1917)
 Ida Aalle-Teljo (1907–1917)
 Matti Aalto (1907–1908)
 Anton Ahlström (1908–1909)
 Matti Airola (1908–1918)
 Valentin Annala (1909–1918, 1924–1926)
 Werner Aro (1908–1914)
 Emanuel Aromaa (1907–1918, 1929–1933)
 Vihtori Aromaa (1907–1908) 
 Nestori Aronen (1909–1918)
 Ville Boman (1909–1911)
 Evert Eloranta (1908–1918)
 Voitto Eloranta (1907–1908)
 Oliver Eronen (1907–1918, 1922–1924)
 Juho Etelämäki (1909–1914)
 Edvard Gylling (1908–1910, 1911–1918)
 Seth Heikkilä (1907–1909, 1910–1911, 1917–1918)
 Ville Heimonen (1907–1908)
 Edvard Helle (1907–1908, 1909–1911, 1919–1921)
 Hilda Herrala (1908–1914, 1917–1918, 1933–1936)
 Matti Hoikka (1907–1914, 1917–1918)
 Evert Hokkanen (1907–1910)
 Anni Huotari (1907–1910, 1911–1918, 1922–1927, 1932–1943)
 Anton Huotari (1908–1910, 1911–1918)
 Pekka (Kalle Petter) Huttunen (1907–1918)
 Samuli Häkkinen (1907–1908, 1914–1918)
 Antti Hämäläinen (1907–1909)
 Kalle Hämäläinen (1907–1914)
 Mimmi Hämäläinen (1909–1911)
 Heikki Häyrynen (1907–1908, 1909–1917)
 Karl Gustaf Höijer (1907–1908)
 Ivar Hörhammer 1909–1911)
 Albert Ingman
 Oskari Jalava
 Georg W. Johansson
 Oscar Johansson
 Alma Jokinen
 Väinö Jokinen
 Olga Jokisalo
 Josua Järvinen
 Oskar Kaipio
 Taavetti Kalliokorpi
 Mimmi Kanervo
 Anshelm Kannisto
 Feliks Kellosalmi
 Aura Kiiskinen
 Jalmari Kirjarinta
 Juho Kirves
 Juho Komu
 Albin Koponen (1907–1918, 1922–1944)
 Juho Korhonen (1908–1909)
 Vilho Korhonen (1908–1909, 1919–1924)
 Frans Koskinen
 Anton Kotonen
 Efraim Kronqvist (1909–1914)
 Otto Wille Kuusinen (1908–1910, 1911–1914, 1917–1918)
 Juho Laakso
 Arvi Lahtinen
 Oskari Fredrik Laine
 Wilho Laine
 Juho Lautasalo
 Sandra Lehtinen
 Frans Lehtonen
 Oskari Leivo
 Heikki Lindroos
 Matti Lonkainen
 Kalle Lumio (1909–1911, 1919–1922)
 William Lundström
 Oskari Lylykorpi
 Atte Mantere
 Janne Martikainen
 Jussi Merinen
 Antti Mäkelin
 Yrjö Mäkelin (1908–1911, 1914–1918)
 Vihtori Mäkelä
 Jaakko Mäki
 Kaarle Mänty
 Pekka Mömmö
 Joel Naaralainen
 Santeri Nuorteva (1907–1908, 1909–1911)
 Oskari Orasmaa
 Matti Paasivuori (1907–1936)
 Maria Paaso
 Antti Partanen
 Penna Paunu
 Emil Perttilä (1907–1908)
 Valfrid Perttilä
 Fiina Pietikäinen (1908–1909)
 Jaakko Piirainen
 Simo Pipatti
 Emanuel Pohjaväre
 Jukka Pohjola
 Hilja Pärssinen (1907–1918, 1929–1935)
 Frans Rantanen
 Samuli Rantanen
 Maria Raunio
 Taavi Rissanen
 Aatu Ruotsalainen
 Santeri Saarikivi (1908–1909, 1910–1911, 1917–1918)
 J. H. Saaristo
 Jussi Sainio
 Eetu Salin
 Kalle Salminen
 Aaro Salo (1907–1914, 1917–1918)
 Anni Savolainen-Tapaninen (1908–1918, 1924–1927)
 Miina Sillanpää (1907–1911, 1914–1917, 1919–1933, 1936–1948)
 Aatto Sirén (1907–1914, 1917–1918, 1929–1920, 1933–1936)
 Yrjö Sirola (1907–1910, 1917–1918)
 Artturi Sivenius
 Aapeli Suomalainen
 Juho Suomalainen
 Vasili Suosaari
 Taavi Tainio (1907–1909, 1911–1914, 1922–1929)
 Väinö Tanner (1907–1911, 1914–1917, 1919–1927, 1930–1944, 1951–1954, 1958–1962)
 Nestori Telkkä
 Paavo Tikkanen
 Oskari Tokoi (1907–1918)
 Onni Tuomi
 Matti Turkia (1907–1909, 1914–1917, 1930–1945)
 O. V. Turunen
 Taneli Typpö (1909–1918, 1922–1929)
 Heikki Törmä (1909–1917, 1919–1922)
 Jenny Upari
 N. R. af Ursin (1907–1908)
 Ville Vainio (1909–1911, 1919–1920)
 Nestori Valavaara
 Albin Valjakka (1907–1918)
 Edvard Valpas-Hänninen (1907–1918)
 August Vesa
 Vihtori Viitanen
 Mikko Virkki
 Sulo Wuolijoki (1907–1914)
 Wäinö Wuolijoki (1907–1910, 1919–1927)

1910s and 1920s

 Artturi Aalto (1919–1933)
 Johan Fredrik Aalto
 Kalle Aalto
 Aleksi Aaltonen
 Hugo Aattela (1929–1945, 1949–1951)
 Fanny Ahlfors (1919–1927, 1930–1933)
 Heikki Ahmala
 Kustaa Ahmala
 Julius Ailio (1919–1922, 1924–1932)
 Toivo Alavirta
 Mikko Ampuja (1919–1941)
 Isak Andersson
 Antero Arho
 Toivo Aro
 Juho Aromaa (1922–1924)
 Viktor Blomqvist
 Tuomas Bryggari
 Otto Elfving (1919–1922, 1926–1927)
 Valfrid Eskola (1922–1924, 1927–1954)
 Jussi Fahler (1927–1929)
 Aino Forsten
 Anna Haapasalo (1919–1922)
 Mimmi Haapasalo (1914–1917)
 Kalle Hakala (1911–1918, 1924–1933, 1934–1947)
 Kalle Fredrik Hakala (1919–1922)
 Väinö Hakkila (1919–1945, 1948–1958)
 Juho Hakkinen
 Aatu Halme
 Alexander Halonen
 Toivo Halonen
 Aapo Harjula
 Kaarlo Harvala (1922–1939)
 Kalle Hautala
 Anna Haverinen (1922–1930)
 Kaarlo Heinonen
 Johan Helo (1919–1922, 1924–1935)
 Tahvo Hiekkaranta
 Leo Hildén
 Olli Hiltunen (1917–1917, 1919–1922)
 Sofia Hjulgrén
 Vihtori Huhta (1914–1917, 1941–1945)
 Anni Huhtinen
 Väinö Hupli
 Herman Hurmevaara (1917–1919)
 Evert Huttunen (1917–1924)
 Pekka (Petter) Huttunen
 Erkki Härmä (1917–1918, 1948–1949)
 Oskari Ikonen
 Rieti Itkonen (1919–1929)
 Heikki Jalonen
 Emil Jokinen
 Juho Kananen (1911–1914, 1919–1922)
 Hanna Karhinen
 Aarne Kauppinen
 Jussi Kautto
 Jaakko Keto (1919–1931)
 Juho Kivikoski
 Ville Kiviniemi
 Väinö Kivisalo
 Jalo Kohonen
 Hanna Kohonen
 Hilma Koivulahti-Lehto (1919–1945, 1948–1951)
 Ville Komu (1927–1942)
 Yrjö Komu (1917–1917, 1922–1927)
 Manu Kontula
 Kustaa Kopila (1910–1911)
 Artturi Koskenkaiku (1919–1922, 1929–1930)
 Janne Korhonen
 Kaarlo Korhonen
 Ville Korhonen (1919–1922)
 August Koskinen 
 Jalmari Kovanen
 Edvard Kujala
 Jaakko Kujala
 Jussi Kujala
 Oskari Kunnassalo (1911–1914)
 Severi Kurkinen (1910–1917)
 August Kuusisto (1927–1929, 1930–1945)
 Elias Käkelä
 Adam Laakkonen
 Jonas Laherma
 Jukka Lankila
 Taavetti Lapveteläinen (1911–1918)
 Matti Lassila
 Jaakko Latvala (1911–1914, 1917–1918, 1927–1929)
 Matti Laukkonen
 Antti Lehikoinen (1919–1924, 1927–1930, 1937–1939)
 Juho Lehmus
 Vilho Lehokas
 Konrad Lehtimäki
 Jussi Lehtinen
 Mooses Lehtinen (1919–1922)
 Toivo Lehto
 Aino Lehtokoski (1919–1949)
 Väinö Lehtola
 Väinö Lehtonen
 Jukka Lehtosaari
 Olga Leinonen (1919–1929)
 Emil Leino
 Jussi Leino
 Jalmari Leino (1927–1930)
 Kalle Lepola
 Sulho Leppä
 Paavo Leppänen
 Lauri Letonmäki
 Maikki Letonmäki
 Konsta Lindqvist
 Alfred Lindroos
 Ludvig Lindström (1914–1917)
 Jalmari Linna (1919–1922, 1928–1945, 1949–1951)
 Jussi Lonkainen
 Santeri Louhelainen
 Arvi Louhelainen (1922–1927)
 Jussi Lumivuokko
 Gabriel Luukkonen
 Edla Lyytinen
 Matti Lepistö
 Petter August Leskinen
 Kullervo Manner (1910–1918)
 Otto Marttila (1911–1917, 1922–1924, 1929–1930, 1933–1939)
 Antti Meriläinen (1919–1922, 1930–1939)
 Pekka Meriläinen
 Eliel Mickelsson
 Olli Miettinen
 Atte Muhonen
 Kaapo Murros
 Emil Murto
 Frans Mustasilta (1914–1917, 1924–1927, 1933–1945)
 Kalle Myllymäki
 Santeri Mäkelä
 Vilho Niemi
 Julius Nurminen
 Antero Nyrkkö
 Nestori Nättinen
 Ville Oksman
 Armas Paasonen (1911–1918, 1924–1929, 1930–1933, 1936–1945)
 Eemeli Paronen (1914–1917, 1917–1919)
 Niilo Patinen
 Mikko Pehkonen
 Otto Peitsalo
 Mauno Pekkala (1927–1945)
 Otto Pensas
 Isak Penttala (1926–1951)
 Kustaa Perho (1929–1944)
 Juho Peura
 Vilho Piippo
 Otto Piisinen (1914–1917)
 Matti Puittinen
 Olavi Puro
 Taavi Pöyhönen
 Emil Raearo (1919–1924)
 Jussi Rainio
 Albert Raitanen
 Sikstus Rönnberg
 Viljo Rantala (1922–1962)
 Jussi Rapo (1918–1933, 1936–1939)
 Oskari Reinikainen (1919–1945)
 Juho Rikkonen
 Toivo Rintala
 Wivi Roslander
 Anni Rytkönen
 Hannes Ryömä (1919–1939)
 Kaarlo Saari (1910–1918, 1924–1926)
 Lyydi Saarikivi 
 Kustaa Adolf Saarinen 
 Emil Saarinen (1910–1918, 1922–1929)
 Emil Sallila 
 Hulda Salmi (1910–1918)
 Tyyne Salomaa 
 Hilda Seppälä 
 Edvard Setälä 
 Leander Sirola (1919–1922, 1924–1927, 1929–1930)
 Julius Sundberg 
 Mikko Suokas 
 Kalle Suosalo 
 Oskari Suutala 
 Reinhold Svento (1922–1945)
 Aino Takala
 Samuli Tervo (1911–1914, 2927–1929, 1930–1948)
 Jussi Tirkkonen
 Anna Toivari
 Otto Toivonen (1917–1917, 1922–1929, 1933–1945, 1951–1954)
 Jussi Tolonen (1914–1917, 1918–1924, 1927–1951)
 Pekka Tonteri
 Ilmari Tossavainen (1914–1917)
 Jukka Tuomikoski
 Toivo Turtiainen
 Arthur Usenius
 Iisakki Valavaara
 Hilma Valjakka (1919–1930)
 August Valta (1927–1930, 1932–1936)
 Kalle Valta (1927–1933, 1941–1944)
 Väinö Vankkoja (1918–1919)
 Helena Vatanen (1911–1914)
 Jussi Vatanen
 Elviira Vihersalo
 Ida Vihuri (1922–1929)
 Juho Virtanen
 Nikolai Virtanen
 Jussi Vuoristo
 Jalmari Väisänen 
 Heikki Välisalmi
 Oskari Väre
 Nestor Väänänen
 Väinö Voionmaa (1919–1947)
 Edvin Wahlstén
 Yrjö Welling (1922–1951)
 Axel Åhlström

1930s and 1940s

 Paavo Aarniokoski
 Kustaa Alanko
 Gunnar Andersson
 Kauko Andersson
 Laura Brander-Wallin
 Karl-August Fagerholm (1930–1966)
 Mikko Erich (aik. Kok., 1930–1933, 1939–1945)
 Vihtori Fallila 
 Yrjö Helenius
 Gunnar Henriksson
 Kaisa Hiilelä
 Onni Hiltunen (1930–1962)
 Emil Huunonen
 Heikki Hykkäälä (1948–1958, 1966–1975)
 Alex Hämäläinen
 Kalle Jokinen
 Arvi Jovero
 Jere Juutilainen
 Veli Järvinen (1948–1951)
 Olavi Kajala (1939–1942, 1948–1951, 1954–1958, 1962–1966)
 Meeri Kalavainen (1948–1979)
 Yrjö Kallinen
 Akseli Kanerva
 Eetu Karjalainen
 Paavo Karjalainen
 Juho Karvonen (1945–1962)
 Kalle Kauhanen
 O. H. Kekäläinen (1939–1945)
 Pekka Kettunen (1933–1936, 1939–1945)
 Viljo Kilpeläinen
 Yrjö Kilpeläinen (1945–1955)
 Eino Kilpi
 Sylvi-Kyllikki Kilpi (1934–1946)
 Artturi Koskinen (1948–1958, 1962–1970)
 Juho Kosonen
 Juho Kuittinen
 Urho Kulovaara
 Ville Kupari
 Walter Kuusela
 Valto Käkelä (1945–1972)
 V. H. Kämäräinen
 Antti Lastu
 Lempi Lehto
 Aleksi Lehtonen
 Tyyne Leivo-Larsson
 Väinö Leskinen (1945–1970)
 Taavi Lindman
 Gottfrid Lindström
 Hjalmar Lindqvist (1930–1933, 1937–1945)
 Kristian Lumijärvi
 Alpo Lumme (1933–1949)
 J. E. Malmivuori
 Toivo Mansner
 Elsa Metsäranta
 Otto Muikku (1945–1958)
 Onni Mäkeläinen
 Pentti Niemi
 Toivo Nokelainen
 Elli Nurminen
 Taavetti Nuutinen
 Rafael Paasio (1948–1975)
 Arvo Paasivuori
 Niilo Pajunen
 Martti Peltonen (1939–1945)
 Onni Peltonen (1933–1962)
 Edvard Pesonen (1933–1939, 1943–1966)
 Heikki Pesonen
 Anselmi Pitkäsilta
 Eeno Pusa (1945–1951, 1956–1958)
 Juho Pyy
 Toivo Pyörtänö (1948–1951)
 Jussi Raatikainen (1936–1951)
 Uuno Raatikainen (1936–1948)
 Pekka Railo (1941–1944)
 Eino Raunio (1939–1970)
 Kaisu-Mirjami Rydberg (1939–1941)
 Mauri Ryömä (1936–1937)
 Yrjö Räisänen (1930–1941)
 Martta Salmela-Järvinen (1939–1958)
 Pietari Salmenoja
 Oskari Salonen
 Väinö V. Salovaara (1939–1945)
 Heikki Simonen (1939–1951)
 Väinö Sinisalo
 Cay Sundström (1936–1941)
 August Syrjänen
 Arvo Sävelä
 Uuno Takki (1945–1952, 1966–1968)
 Penna Tervo (1945–1956)
 Armas Tolonen
 Antti Tossavainen
 Jorma Tuominen (1940–1945)
 Arvi Turkka (1933–1945, 1948–1958)
 Varma K. Turunen (1939–1962)
 Unto Varjonen
 Vilho Väyrynen
 K. J. Wenman
 Atos Wirtanen (1936–1946)

1950s and 1960s

 Lyyli Aalto (1958–1979)
 Arvo Ahonen (1951–1979)
 Eero Antikainen
 Pirkko Aro (1973–1979)
 Reino Breilin (1966–1983)
 Pauli Burman (1966–1970, 1974–1975)
 Georg Eriksson
 Margit Eskman (1966–1975)
 Anni Flinck (1954–1975)
 Kalervo Haapasalo (1951–1975)
 Antti Halme (1966–1970, 1973–1975)
 Vappu Heinonen
 Veikko Helle (1951–1983)
 Voitto Hellstén (1962–1970)
 Kaarlo af Heurlin (1966–1970)
 Sulo Hostila (1956–1975)
 Mikko Hult (1954–1958)
 Eero Häkkinen
 Seija Karkinen (1966–1983, 1987–1991)
 Urho Knuuti (1966–1972)
 Sakari Knuuttila (1966–1991)
 Veikko Kokkola (1951–1970)
 Pekka Kuusi (1966–1970)
 Mikko Laaksonen (1966–1971)
 Valdemar Liljeström (1955–1958)
 Bror Lillqvist (1966–1983)
 Olavi Lindblom (1954–1966)
 Lars Lindeman (1958–1976)
 Ilmari Linna (1962–1970)
 Sinikka Luja-Penttilä (1966–1983)
 Impi Lukkarinen (1951–1958)
 Elis Manninen (1958–1966)
 Kalle Matilainen (1956–1970)
 Veikko Mattila (1964–1970)
 Erkki Mohell
 Uljas Mäkelä (1962–1978)
 V. O. Mäkinen (1966–1975)
 Valde Nevalainen (1966–1975)
 Esko Niskanen (1966–1975)
 Ilmo Paananen (1966–1972)
 Tyyne Paasivuori (1954–1958, 1962–1974)
 Ensio Partanen (1958–1970)
 Antti Pennanen (1966–1970)
 Antti-Veikko Perheentupa (1966–1972)
 Kaarlo Pitsinki (1958–1966)
 Lauri Puntila (1966–1970)
 Akseli Rodén (1964–1970, 1972–1975)
 Aune Salama (1966–1975)
 Arvo Salo (1966–1970, 1979–1983)
 Eero Salo (1968–1975)
 Valdemar Sandelin (1962–1973)
 Sylvi Siltanen (1958–1972)
 Aarre Simonen (1951–1958)
 Eino Sirén 
 Bruno J. Sundman (1951–1958)
 Unto Suominen
 Edit Terästö (1962–1972)
 Ville Tikkanen (1966–1975)
 Väinö Tikkaoja
 Arvo Tuominen (1958–1962)
 Heikki Törmä (1958–1959)
 Väinö Vilponiemi (1962–1975)
 Viljo Virtanen (1951–1970)
 Uuno Voutilainen (1962–1979)
 Antero Väyrynen (1962–1970)

1970s and 1980s

 Markus Aaltonen (1975–1991, 1995–1999)
 Matti Ahde (1970–1990, 2003–2011)
 Risto Ahonen (1983–1991)
 Aimo Ajo (1972–1991)
 Pirjo Ala-Kapee (1979–1989)
 Arja Alho (1983–1999, 2003–2007)
 Jouni Backman (1987–2007, 2011–2015) 
 Aarno von Bell (1983–1987, 1990–1995)
 Ilkka-Christian Björklund (aik. SKDL, 1987–1991)
 Kaj Bärlund (1979–1991)
 Paula Eenilä (1975–1987)
 Mikko Elo (1979–1991, 1995–2007)
 Mauno Forsman (1971–1983)
 Ralf Friberg (1970–1979)
 Eino Grönholm (1975–1983)
 Jukka Gustafsson (1987–)
 Iiris Hacklin (1987–1995)
 Tarja Halonen (1979–2000)
 Olli Helminen (1975–1987)
 Pertti Hietala (1979–1991)
 Sinikka Hurskainen (1983–1999, 2003–2011)
 Niilo Hämäläinen (1979–1983)
 Tuulikki Hämäläinen (1983–1999)
 Liisa Jaakonsaari (1979–2009)
 Ilkka Joenpalo (1987–1991, 1995–1997)
 Sven-Erik Järvinen (1975–1979)
 Riitta Järvisalo (1972–1979, 1982–1991)
 Osmo Kaipainen (1970–1975)
 Kai Kalima (1989–1991)
 Antti Kalliomäki (1983–2011)
 Anna-Liisa Kasurinen (1979–1995)
 Tarja Kautto (1989–2003)
 Antero Kekkonen (1987–2007)
 Leo Kohtala (1970–1975)
 (Taimi) Tellervo Koivisto (1972–1975)
 Tellervo Maria Koivisto (1970–1982)
 Matti Kuusio (1975–1979, 1983–1987)
 Pentti Lahti-Nuuttila
  (1970–1971)
 Jermu Laine (1975–1987)
 Arto Lapiolahti
 Lasse Lehtinen (1972–1983)
 Eeli Lepistö
 Erkki Liikanen (1972–1990)
 Reijo Lindroos
 Paavo Lipponen (1983–1987, 1991–2007)
 Eino Loikkanen
 Matti Louekoski (1976–1979, 1983–1996)
 Matti Luttinen (1975–1995)
 Martti Lähdesmäki
 Lauri Metsämäki
 Jukka Mikkola (1983–1987, 1995–2003)
 Peter Muurman
 Riitta Myller (1987–1995, 2011–)
 Pekka Myllyniemi (1983–1987)
 Salme Myyryläinen
 Jouko Mäkelä
 Sinikka Mönkäre (1987–1991, 1995–2006)
 Mats Nyby (1983–1999)
 Saara-Maria Paakkinen (1979–1995)
 Reino Paasilinna (1983–1990, 1995–1996)
 Pertti Paasio (1975–1975, 1982–1996)
 Veikko Pajunen (1972–1979)
 Markku Pohjola (1987–1991, 1995–1999)
 Antti Pohjonen (1972–1977)
 Matti Puhakka (1975–1991, 1995–1996)
 Virpa Puisto (1987–2007)
 Raimo Päivinen
 Kaisa Raatikainen (1970–1987)
 Pentti Rajala
 Kari Rajamäki (1983–2015)
 Maija Rajantie
 Jussi Ranta
 Jorma Rantala (1972–1983)
 Jorma Rantanen (1983–1987, 1991–1999)
 Juhani Raudasoja
 Heikki Rinne (1983–1999)
 Jukka Roos (1987–1999, 2003–2007)
 Timo Roos (1983–1995)
 Mikko Rönnholm (1979–1987, 1991–1995)
 Matti Saarinen (1987–1991, 1995–2015)
 Kaarle Salmivuori
 Tuula Sarja
 Lea Savolainen (1975–1995)
 Helge Sirén
 Jouko Skinnari (1980–2015)
 Kalevi Sorsa (1970–1991)
 Pekka Starast (1979–1987)
 Keijo Suksi
 Ulf Sundqvist (1970–1983)
 Kaarina Suonio (1975–1986)
 Juhani Surakka (1975–1987)
 Jacob Söderman (1972–1983, 2007–2011)
 Ilkka Taipale (1970–1975, 2000–2007)
 Hannu Tapiola (1979–1983)
 Arto Tiainen (1970)
 Paavo Tiilikainen (1970–1979)
 Seppo Tikka (1972–1987)
 Risto Tuominen
 Erkki Tuomioja (1970–1979, 1991–)
 Jouko Tuovinen (1975–1987)
 Väinö Turunen
 Marja-Liisa Tykkyläinen (1983–2007)
 Pirkko Työläjärvi (1972–1985)
 Kerttu Törnqvist (1983–1999)
 Kari Urpilainen (1983–1995, 1999–2007)
 Pirkko Valtonen (1978–1983, 1985–1987)
 Raimo Vuoristo (1987–1995)
 Matti Vähänäkki (1987–2003)

1990s  and 2000s

 Marko Asell (2007–2011, 2019–)
 Arto Bryggare (1995–1999, 2003–2007)
 Maarit Feldt-Ranta (2007–2019)
 Tarja Filatov (1995–)
 Maria Guzenina (2007–)
 Tuula Haatainen (1996–2007, 2015–)
 Eero Heinäluoma (2003–2019)
 Klaus Hellberg (1995–2007)
 Rakel Hiltunen (1999–2015)
 Raimo Holopainen (1996–1999)
 Susanna Huovinen (1999–2018)
 Ulpu Iivari (1991–1995)
 Ulla Juurola (1995–2003)
 Reijo Kallio (1995–2011)
 Erkki Kanerva (1999–2003)
 Ilkka Kantola (2007–2019)
 Saara Karhu (1999–2015)
 Tapio Karjalainen (1995–2003)
 Anneli Kiljunen (2003–)
 Kimmo Kiljunen (1995–2011, 2019–)
 Krista Kiuru (2007–)
 Valto Koski (1995–2011)
 Johannes Koskinen (1991–2015, 2019–)
 Marjaana Koskinen (1995–2011)
 Risto Kuisma (1995–1997, 2002–2007, 2010–2011) (defected to Young Finns and later to Reformist group)
 Jorma Kukkonen (1995–1999)
 Miapetra Kumpula-Natri (2003–2014)
 Merja Kuusisto (2007–2015)
 Lauri Kähkönen (1995–2011)
 Erja Lahikainen (1991–1995)
 Esa Lahtela (1995–2011)
 Reijo Laitinen (1991–2011)
 Minna Lintonen (2003–2007)
 Päivi Lipponen (2007–2015)
 Leena Luhtanen (1991–2007)
 Kyllikki Muttilainen (1990–1995)
 Raimo Mähönen (1995–2003)
 Arja Ojala (1991–1999)
 Reino Ojala (1995–1999, 2003–2007)
 Johanna Ojala-Niemelä (2007–)
 Kalevi Olin (1995–2007)
 Heli Paasio (1999–2015)
 Sirpa Paatero (2006–)
 Erkki J. Partanen (1995–1999)
 Pirkko Peltomo (1991–2007)
 Tuula Peltonen (2007–2015)
 Raimo Piirainen (2009–2015, 2019–)
 Tuija Pohjola (1995–1999)
 Riitta Prusti (1995–1999)
 Susanna Rahkonen (1999–2007)
 Maija Rask (1991–2007)
 Tero Rönni (1995–2011)
 Arto Seppälä (1999–2007)
 Tommy Tabermann (2007–2010)
 Säde Tahvanainen (1995–2007)
 Katja Taimela (2007–)
 Satu Taiveaho (2003–2011)
 Jutta Urpilainen (2003–2019)
 Helena Vartiainen (1996–1999)
 Marjatta Vehkaoja (1991–2003)
 Janne Viitamies (1995–1999)
 Pauliina Viitamies (2007–2015)
 Pia Viitanen (1995–)
 Marja-Leena Viljamaa (1991–1999)
 Antti Vuolanne (2003–2011)
 Tuula Väätäinen (2003–2015, 2019–)
 Harry Wallin (1999–2007, 2014–2019)

2010s

 Hussein al-Taee (2019–)
 Kim Berg (2019–)
 Eeva-Johanna Eloranta (2011–)
 Seppo Eskelinen (2019–)
 Timo Harakka (2015–)
 Eveliina Heinäluoma (2019–)
 Lauri Ihalainen (2011–2019)
 Mikael Jungner (2011–2015)
 Mika Kari (2011–)
 Johan Kvarnström (2019–)
 Suna Kymäläinen (2011–)
 Jukka Kärnä (2011–2015)
 Aki Lindén (2019–)
 Antti Lindtman (2011–)
 Niina Malm (2019–)
 Sanna Marin (2015–)
 Riitta Mäkinen (2018–)
 Merja Mäkisalo-Ropponen (2011–)
 Matias Mäkynen  (2019–)
 Ilmari Nurminen (2015–)
 Piritta Rantanen (2019–)
 Nasima Razmyar (2015–2017)
 Antti Rinne (2015–)
 Joona Räsänen (2015–2019)
 Kristiina Salonen (2011–)
 Ville Skinnari (2015–)
 Satu Taavitsainen (2015–2019)
 Hanna Tainio (2011–2015)
 Maria Tolppanen (2016–) (defected from the Finns Party's group)
 Pilvi Torsti (2017–2019)
 Tytti Tuppurainen (2011–)
 Heidi Viljanen (2019–)
 Paula Werning (2019–)

Social Democratic Union of Workers and Smallholders 

 Laura Brander-Wallin 1962
 Vappu Heinonen 1958–1962, 1966–1970 (defected from Social Democratic Party)
 Mikko Hult 1958–1962 (defected from Social Democratic Party)
 Armas Härkönen 1958–1962
 Urho Kulovaara  1958–1962 (defected from Social Democratic Party)
 Tyyne Leivo-Larsson 1966–1970
 Valdemar Liljeström 1958–1960 (defected from Social Democratic Party)
 Impi Lukkarinen 1958–1970 (defected from Social Democratic Party)
 Aino Malkamäki 1960–1961
 Viljo Pousi 1966–1970
 Eeno Pusa 1961–1962
 Olavi Saarinen 1966–1970
 Martta Salmela-Järvinen 1958–1966 (defected from Social Democratic Party)
 Aili Siiskonen 1958–1962, 1966–1970
 Aarre Simonen 1958–1962 (defected from Social Democratic Party)
 Arvo Sävelä  1958–1962 (defected from Social Democratic Party)
 Arvi Turkka  1958–1962 (defected from Social Democratic Party)
 Vilho Turunen 1958–1962
 Heikki Törmä 1959–1962 (defected from Social Democratic Party)
 Olli J. Uoti 1959–1962, 1966–1967

Socialistic parliamentary group 
 Mikko Ampuja  (1940–1941, 1944–1945) (defected from Social Democratic Party group)
 Väinö Meltti (1941, 1944–1945)
 Kaisu-Mirjami Rydberg (1940–1941, 1944–1945) (defected from Social Democratic Party and later to People's Democratic League group)
 Yrjö Räisänen (1940–1941, 1944–1945) (defected from Social Democratic Party and later to People's Democratic League group)
 Cay Sundström (1940–1941, 1944–1945) (defected from Social Democratic Party and later to People's Democratic League group)
 Karl Harald Wiik (1940–1941, 1944–1945) (defected from Social Democratic Party and later to People's Democratic League group)

Socialistic Workers and Smallholders Parliamentary group

 Aleksander Allila 1924–1927
 Aatami Asikainen 1924–1929
 Yrjö Enne 1927–1928 
 Verner Halén 1929–1930
 Edvard Huttunen 1924–1925
 Ida Hämäläinen 1927–1929
 August Isaksson 1924–1929
 Edvard Jokela 1924–1927
 Väinö Kallio 1929–1930
 Juho Komulainen 1924–1927
 Kalle Kulmala 1924–1930
 Martta Kurkilahti 1927
 Kalle Kyhälä 1929–1930
 Toivo Latva 1927–1928
 Yrjö Lehtinen 1927–1929
 Arvo Lehto 1929–1930
 Jaakko Liedes 1924–1930
 Kalle Meriläinen 1929–1930
 Lauri Myllymäki 1927–1930
 Aukusti Mäenpää 1930
 Uno Nurminen 1924–1927
 Eino Pekkala 1927–1930
 Juho Perälä 1928–1930
 Taavi Pitkänen 1927
 Väinö Pohjaranta 1929–1930
 Emanuel Ramstedt 1924–1929
 Arvo Riihimäki 1927–1930
 Mauritz Rosenberg 1924–1930
 Janne Räsänen 1924–1927
 Jalmari Rötkö 1929–1930
 Asser Salo 1929–1930
 Filemon Savenius 1924–1929
 Salomo Savolainen 1927–1929
 Antti Soikkeli 1924–1927
 Pekka Strengell 1924–1927, 1928–1930
 Emil Tabell 1924–1930
 Konsta Talvio 1929–1930
 William Tanner 1927–1930
 Bruno Tenhunen 1924
 Aukusti Turunen 1927–1930 
 Siina Urpilainen 1927–1930
 Kaarlo Varho 1926–1927
 Jalmari Virta 1924–1930
 Konsta Vuokila 1924
 Svantte Vuorio 1924–1925
 Heikki Väisänen 1929–1930

Socialist Workers' Party 

 Elin Airamo (1922–1923)
 Toivo Aronen (1922–1923)
 Jaakko Enqvist (1922–1923)
 Väinö Hannula (1922–1923)
 Hilda Hannunen (1920–1923)
 Frans Hiilos (1922–1923)
 Laura Härmä (1922–1923)
 Albert Kallio (1922–1923)
 Kalle Kankari (1922–1923)
 Pekka Kemppi (1922–1923)
 Aukusti Koivisto (1922–1923)
 Kalle Lampinen (1922–1923)
 Toivo Hjalmar Långström (1922–1923)
 Emmi Mäkelin (1922–1923)
 Heikki Mäkinen (1922–1923)
 Antti Nahkala (1922–1923)
 Pekka Nurmiranta (1922–1923)
 Hannes Pulkkinen (1922–1923)
 August Rytkönen (1922–1923)
 Rosa Sillanpää (1922–1923)
 Kalle Toppinen (1922–1923)
 Lempi Tuomi (1922–1923)
 Vihtori Vainio (1923–1923)
 Ville Vainio (1920–1923)
 Yrjö Valkama (1922–1923)
 Juho Vesterlund (1922–1923)
 Matti Väisänen (1922)

Swedish People's Party 

 Anders Adlercreutz (2015–)
 Frans Ahlroos (1907–1909)
 Kristian von Alfthan (1907–1909)
 Torsten Aminoff (1960–1962)
 Amos Anderson (1922–1927)
 Elis Andersson (1959–1966)
 Ossian Aschan (1910–1911)
 Johannes Bengs (1922–1924)
 Sandra Bergqvist (2019–)
 Eva Biaudet (1991–2006, 2015–)
 Matts Björk (1910–1914, 1917–1919, 1924–1927, 1930–1933)
 Konrad Björkstén (1909–1910)
 Gustav Björkstrand (1987–1991)
 Thomas Blomqvist (2007–)
 Elsa Bonsdorff (1936–1945)
 Ernst von Born (1919–1954)
 Viktor Magnus von Born (1910–1914)
 Adolf Bredenberg (1914–1917)
 Klaus Bremer (1995–2003)
 Johan Broman (1927–1929)
 Albert Brommels (1945–1951)
 Johan Broända (1919–1924)
 Lennart Byman (1922)
 Immanuel Bäck (1922–1924, 1927–1930)
 Johannes Bäck (1907–1914, 1917–1919)
 Axel Cederberg (1907–1909)
 Rafael Colliander (1909–1910, 1917–1924, 1927–1930, 1933–1938)
 Jörn Donner (1987–1995, 2007, 2013–2015)
 Georg C. Ehrnrooth (1958–1973) (formed new group; Constitutional People's Party)
 Leo Ehrnrooth (1907–1909, 1917)
 Artur Eklund (1919–1922)
 Jan-Erik Enestam (1991–2007) 
 Rainer Erlund (1999) (formed new group; Group Erlund)
 Ernst Estlander (1907–1914, 1917–1945)
 Anders Forsberg (1924–1930)
 John Forsberg (1954–1958)
 Arthur af Forselles (1919–1922)
 Jenny af Forselles (1909–1910, 1911–1917)
 Matts Forss (1945–1951)
 Johan Franzén (1935–1936)
 Erik von Frenckell (1927–1939)
 Alexander Frey (1917)
 Ole Frietsch (1936–1945)
 Annie Furuhjelm (1914–1924, 1927–1929)
 Ragnar Furuhjelm (1917–1944)
 Alexander Gadolin (1914–1917)
 Christina Gestrin (2000–2015)
 Kristian Gestrin (1962–1979)
 George Granfelt (1908–1909, 1910–1911, 1912–1914)
 Nils-Anders Granvik (1999–2007)
 Ragnar Granvik (1966–1979)
 Julius Grotenfelt (1910–1914)
 Fridolf Gustafsson (1907–1908)
 Gustaf Gädda (1910–1919)
 Lars Gästgivars (2011–2015)
 Edvard Haga (1929–1944)
 Carl Haglund (2015–2016)
 Mauritz Hallberg (1910–1911)
 Reinhold Hedberg (1907–1909, 1917–1919)
 Walter Heimbürger (1908–1909)
 Edvard Helenelund (1919–1924, 1927–1929, 1930–1945)
 Pähr-Einar Hellström (1985–1987)
 Anna-Maja Henriksson (2007–)
 Uno Hildén (1930–1933, 1936–1945)
 Viktor Hintz (1929–1930)
 Vera Hjelt (1908–1917)
 Ture Hollstén (1945–1948, 1951–1954)
 Einar Holmberg (1939–1945)
 Mårten Holmberg (1909–1910)
 Eirik Hornborg (1917–1922, 1924–1927)
 Evald Häggblom (1966–1976)
 Gunnar Häggblom (1976–1983)
 Emil Hästbacka (1917–1948)
 Sven Högström (1954–1966)
 Johannes Inborr (1909–1919, 1922–1933)
 William Isaksson (1914–1917)
 Otto Jacobsson (1924–1934)
 Gunnar Jansson (1983–2003)
 Roger Jansson (2003–2007)
 Oskar Jeppson (1922–1924)
 Levi Jern (1922–1954)
 Hugo Johansson (1939–1945)
 Johannes Jungarå (1958–1966)
 Axel Juselius (1909–1910)
 Karl Julian Karlsson (1907–1908)
 Johannes Klockars (1924–1927)
 Verner Korsbäck (1948–1972)
 Augusta Krook (1909–1910)
 Evert Kulenius (1922–1927)
 Magnus Kull (1966–1970)
 Berndt Kullberg (1927–1929)
 Henrik Kullberg (1927–1930, 1933–1945, 1945–1953)
 Gunnar Landtman (1922–1924)
 Arthur Larson (1948–1959)
 Karl Laurén (1919–1922, 1924–1927, 1929–1930, 1936–1939)
 Per Laurén (1962–1966)
 Henrik Lax (1987–2004)
 Axel Lille (1917)
 Gustaf Lindberg (1924–1930)
 Julius Lindberg (1914–1917, 1922–1924)
 Uno Lindelöf (1909–1914)
 Bertel Lindh (1953–1966)
 Mats Löfström (2015–)
 Pehr Löv (1995–2007)
 Håkan Malm (1975–1999)
 Josef Mangs (1924–1927, 1929–1930, 1933–1936, 1939–1945)
 Herman Mattsson (1933–1936, 1938–1939)
 Leo Mechelin (1910–1914)
 Nils Meinander (1945–1962)
 Ingvar S. Melin (1966–1972, 1975–1983, 1987–1991)
 Gustaf Mickels (1922–1924)
 Johannes Miemois (1914–1917, 1919–1924)
 Knut Molin (1924–1930, 1932–1933)
 Elisabeth Nauclér (2007–2015)
 Arvid Neovius (1907–1917)
 Dagmar Neovius (1907–1909, 1910–1911, 1914–1917)
 Oskar Nix (1907–1910, 1919–1922)
 Kurt Nordfors (1951–1966)
 Ivar Nordlund (1909–1912)
 Håkan Nordman (1983–1995, 1999–2003, 2007–2011)
 Torsten Nordström (1936–1939, 1951–1962, 1966–1970)
 Anders Norrback (2019–)
 Ole Norrback (1979–1981, 1991–1999)
 August Nybergh (1910–1914)
 Mikaela Nylander (2003–2019)
 Mats Nylund (2007–2019)
 Kuno Nyman (1930–1936, 1944–1945)
 Per-Henrik Nyman (1987–1991)
 Jakob Näs (1907–1908)
 Karl Oljemark (1907–1908) 
 Mikko Ollikainen (2019–) 
 Karl Ottelin (1917–1919)
 Axel Palmgren (1917–1922, 1924–1936)
 Margareta Pietikäinen (1991–2003)
 Hjalmar J. Procopé (1919–1922, 1924–1926)
 Victor Procopé (1958–1962, 1966–1975)
 August Ramsay (1919–1922)
 Elisabeth Rehn (1979–1995)
 Veronica Rehn-Kivi (2016–)
 Boris Renlund (1979–1995)
 Eric von Rettig (1917–1919)
 Emil Roos (1917, 1930–1933)
 Wilhelm Roos (1909–1917, 1917–1924)
 Ola Rosendahl (1995–2003)
 Gustaf Rosenqvist (1907–1919)
 Vilhelm Rosenqvist (1907–1909)
 Torsten Rothberg (1930–1933)
 Johan Wilhelm Runeberg (1907–1908)
 Frans Sandblom (1922–1924)
 Carl Sanmark (1929–1930)
 Emil Sarlin (1930–1933)
 Oskar Schultz (1907–1908)
 Emil Schybergson (1907–1909, 1910–1919)
 Elly Sigfrids (1970–1979)
 Johan Sjöblom (1933–1936)
 Otto Slätis (1907–1908)
 Helmer Smeds (1945–1948)
 Hedvig Sohlberg (1908–1914)
 Gösta Stenbäck (1908–1910, 1914–1917)
 Pär Stenbäck (1970–1985)
 Fredrik Stenström (1909–1910)
 Edvin Stenwall (1936–1939)
 Albert Stigzelius (1908–1909)
 Johan Storbjörk (1907–1917)
 Johannes Storbjörk (1917)
 Joakim Strand (2015–)
 Gustaf Storgårds (1914–1917)
 Johan Strömberg (1909–1910, 1911–1917)
 Julius Sundblom (1907–1919)
 Alwar Sundell (1958–1966)
 Johan Otto Söderhjelm (1933–1939, 1944–1951, 1962–1966)
 Karl Söderholm (1907–1914, 1917)
 Gunnar Takolander (1914–1917)
 Carl Olof Tallgren (1961–1975)
 Christoffer Taxell (1975–1991)
 Grels Teir (1951–1975)
 Astrid Thors (2003, 2004–2013)
 Raimo Tiilikainen (1995–1999)
 Eric von Troil (1908–1917)
 August Tåg (1911–1919, 1927–1929)
 Adolf Törngren (1914–1917)
 Ralf Törngren (1936–1961)
 Stefan Wallin (2007–2019)
 Osvald Wasastjerna (1907–1908)
 Ole Wasz-Höckert (1983–1991)
 Henrik Westerlund (1966–1995)
 Wilhelm Westman (1930–1933)
 Emil Wichmann (1908–1909)
 Albin Wickman (1933–1958, 1962–1966)
 Ulla-Maj Wideroos (1995–2015)
 Johannes Wiik (1917)
 Rolf Witting (1924–1927)
 Rabbe Axel Wrede (1910–1914, 1917–1919)
 Ferdinand von Wright (1922–1924)
 Jutta Zilliacus (1975–1987)
 Kristian Åkerblom (1917, 1919–1929, 1930–1933)
 Otto Åkesson (1917–1919)
 Arne Öhman (1948–1958)
 Ebba Östenson (1933–1936, 1939–1954)
 John Österholm (1919–1960)

Young Finnish Party

 Pekka Ahmavaara (1907–1917, 1917–1918)
 Santeri Alkio (1907) (defected to Agriarian League group)
 Erik Alopaeus
 Gustaf Arokallio (1907–1909, 1910–1918)
 Juho Astala
 Helena Brander (1917–1918)
 Uuno Brander (1907–1910, 1911–1917)
 Arthur Castrén (1909–1913)
 Jonas Castrén (1907–1917)
 Zachris Castrén (1909–1910)
 Eero Erkko (1907–1918)
 Aleksanteri Fränti (1909–1914, 1917)
 Kustavi Grotenfelt (1908–1909)
 Lucina Hagman (1907–1908, 1917)
 Edvard Hannula (1909–1914)
 Juho Haveri (1907–1908, 1909–1910)
 Samppa Heiskanen
 Gabriel Hirvensalo (1914–1917)
 Rudolf Holsti (1914–1918)
 Theodor Homén (1908–1914)
 Tekla Hultin (1908–1918)
 Nestor Huoponen (1907–1909)
 Pekka Hälvä
 Kustaa Jalkanen (1911–1914)
 Väinö Juustila (1918)
 Antti Kaasalainen
 Teuvo Kaitila
 Kyösti Kanniainen
 Juho Kaskinen (1908–1910, 1911–1917)
 Matti Kekki (1910–1911)
 Juho Keltanen
 Kustaa Killinen
 Mikko Knuutila (1907–1908)
 William Koskelin (1907–1909, 1910–1911, 1917)
 Pietari Kuisma 
 Juhani Kurikka 
 Martti Kykkling 
 Augusta Laine (1917–1918)
 Johannes Laine
 Juho Laitinen
 Mikko Latva
 Pekka Leppänen (1907–1908)
 Hugo Lilius
 Oskar Lilius
 Eemil Linna (1913–1917, 1917–1918)
 Hugo Linna (1917)
 Johannes Lundson (1917–1918)
 Albert Luoma
 Tilda Löthman-Koponen (1910–1911, 1914–1917, 1917–1919)
 Antti Mikkola (1907–1908, 1909–1910, 1917–1918)
 Akseli Nikula (1914–1917)
 Alli Nissinen
 Oskar Nissinen
 Aapo Nuora (1909–1910, 1911–1914)
 Hannes Nylander
 Pekka Paavolainen (1914–1919)
 Erkki Peltonen
 Pekka Pennanen (1907–1919)
 Matti Pesonen (1907–1908)
 Otto Pesonen
 Matti Pietinen
 Onni Puhakka (1910–1914)
 Heikki Renvall (1907–1908, 1910–1914)
 Tahvo Riihelä (1907–1914)
 Heikki Ritavuori (1914–1917)
 Mauno Rosendal
 Jaakko Saariaho (1913–1914)
 Emil Setälä (1907–1909, 1910–1911, 1917–1918)
 Elias Sinkko (1909–1910, 1914–1918)
 Juho Snellman (1907–1908, 1909–1914, 1917–1918)
 Elias Sopanen (1914–1917)
 Otto Stenroth (1908–1909)
 Kaarlo Juho Ståhlberg (1908–1910, 1914–1918)
 Pehr Evind Svinhufvud (1907–1917)
 Wille Särkkä (1917–1918)
 Onni Talas (1909–1918)
 August Tanttu (1908–1909, 1910–1917)
 Otto Thuneberg (1917)
 Eemil Vekara
 Kalle Viljakainen (1907–1913)
 Kaarlo Wikman
 Emil Åkesson (1909–1911)

Young Finns 
 Risto Kuisma (1997–1998) 1994–1995) (defected from Social Democratic Party and later to Reformist group)
 Risto E. J. Penttilä (1995–1999)
 Jukka Tarkka (1995–1999)

References

Lists of members of the Parliament of Finland